This is a partial list of unnumbered minor planets for principal provisional designations assigned between 1 April and 31 May 2002. , a total of 416 bodies remain unnumbered for this period. Objects for this year are listed on the following pages: A–B · C · D–F · G–K · L–O · P · Qi · Qii · Ri · Rii · S · Ti · Tii · U–V and W–Y. Also see previous and next year.

G 

|- id="2002 GQ" bgcolor=#FFC2E0
| 3 || 2002 GQ || ATE || 26.3 || data-sort-value="0.020" | 20 m || single || 7 days || 08 Apr 2002 || 20 || align=left | Disc.: LINEAR || 
|- id="2002 GR" bgcolor=#FFC2E0
| 5 || 2002 GR || APO || 23.2 || data-sort-value="0.081" | 81 m || single || 48 days || 21 May 2002 || 58 || align=left | Disc.: LINEAR || 
|- id="2002 GX" bgcolor=#d6d6d6
| 0 || 2002 GX || MBA-O || 16.2 || 3.2 km || multiple || 2002–2019 || 08 May 2019 || 48 || align=left | Disc.: NEATAdded on 17 January 2021Alt.: 2016 QM102 || 
|- id="2002 GZ" bgcolor=#E9E9E9
| 0 || 2002 GZ || MBA-M || 16.1 || 3.4 km || multiple || 2002–2020 || 04 May 2020 || 188 || align=left | Disc.: NEAT || 
|- id="2002 GG1" bgcolor=#FFC2E0
| 6 ||  || APO || 23.5 || data-sort-value="0.071" | 71 m || single || 96 days || 09 Jul 2002 || 29 || align=left | Disc.: NEATAMO at MPC || 
|- id="2002 GJ1" bgcolor=#FFC2E0
| 7 ||  || APO || 23.3 || data-sort-value="0.078" | 78 m || single || 1 day || 05 Apr 2002 || 15 || align=left | Disc.: AMOS || 
|- id="2002 GK1" bgcolor=#FFC2E0
| 7 ||  || APO || 22.5 || data-sort-value="0.11" | 110 m || single || 6 days || 10 Apr 2002 || 46 || align=left | Disc.: LINEAR || 
|- id="2002 GA3" bgcolor=#E9E9E9
| 0 ||  || MBA-M || 17.91 || 1.8 km || multiple || 2000–2021 || 29 Nov 2021 || 109 || align=left | Disc.: NEAT || 
|- id="2002 GB3" bgcolor=#d6d6d6
| 2 ||  || MBA-O || 17.5 || 1.8 km || multiple || 2002–2019 || 02 Jul 2019 || 20 || align=left | Disc.: NEATAdded on 22 July 2020 || 
|- id="2002 GO3" bgcolor=#E9E9E9
| 1 ||  || MBA-M || 16.6 || 2.0 km || multiple || 2002–2020 || 20 Oct 2020 || 155 || align=left | Disc.: NEAT || 
|- id="2002 GS3" bgcolor=#FA8072
| 2 ||  || HUN || 19.0 || data-sort-value="0.47" | 470 m || multiple || 2002–2020 || 14 Dec 2020 || 70 || align=left | Disc.: LINEAR || 
|- id="2002 GW3" bgcolor=#FA8072
| 1 ||  || MCA || 18.40 || data-sort-value="0.62" | 620 m || multiple || 2002–2022 || 09 Jan 2022 || 59 || align=left | Disc.: NEATAlt.: 2012 FA23 || 
|- id="2002 GY3" bgcolor=#FA8072
| 1 ||  || MCA || 18.54 || data-sort-value="0.58" | 580 m || multiple || 2002–2020 || 17 Oct 2020 || 64 || align=left | Disc.: NEATAlt.: 2005 GF || 
|- id="2002 GA4" bgcolor=#fefefe
| – ||  || MBA-I || 18.4 || data-sort-value="0.62" | 620 m || single || 20 days || 29 Apr 2002 || 14 || align=left | Disc.: NEAT || 
|- id="2002 GM5" bgcolor=#FFC2E0
| 9 ||  || APO || 21.5 || data-sort-value="0.18" | 180 m || single || 7 days || 17 Apr 2002 || 22 || align=left | Disc.: LINEARPotentially hazardous object || 
|- id="2002 GN5" bgcolor=#FFC2E0
| 2 ||  || AMO || 22.2 || data-sort-value="0.13" | 130 m || multiple || 2002–2004 || 18 Feb 2004 || 57 || align=left | Disc.: LINEAR || 
|- id="2002 GP5" bgcolor=#FFC2E0
| 4 ||  || AMO || 20.3 || data-sort-value="0.31" | 310 m || single || 58 days || 08 Jun 2002 || 40 || align=left | Disc.: NEAT || 
|- id="2002 GQ5" bgcolor=#FFC2E0
| 1 ||  || APO || 20.85 || data-sort-value="0.24" | 240 m || multiple || 2002–2021 || 06 Jul 2021 || 60 || align=left | Disc.: NEAT || 
|- id="2002 GS5" bgcolor=#fefefe
| 1 ||  || MBA-I || 18.0 || data-sort-value="0.75" | 750 m || multiple || 2002–2021 || 17 Jan 2021 || 89 || align=left | Disc.: NEATAlt.: 2010 DL63, 2012 XQ147 || 
|- id="2002 GY5" bgcolor=#d6d6d6
| 0 ||  || MBA-O || 16.86 || 2.4 km || multiple || 2002–2021 || 11 Nov 2021 || 50 || align=left | Disc.: NEATAlt.: 2013 GH68 || 
|- id="2002 GB6" bgcolor=#d6d6d6
| 2 ||  || MBA-O || 16.8 || 2.4 km || multiple || 2002–2019 || 25 May 2019 || 48 || align=left | Disc.: AMOSAlt.: 2019 EV3 || 
|- id="2002 GG6" bgcolor=#E9E9E9
| 1 ||  || MBA-M || 18.02 || 1 km || multiple || 2002-2020 || 15 Oct 2020 || 52 || align=left | Disc.: NEAT || 
|- id="2002 GS6" bgcolor=#fefefe
| 0 ||  || HUN || 18.02 || data-sort-value="0.74" | 740 m || multiple || 2000–2021 || 09 May 2021 || 133 || align=left | Disc.: LINEAR || 
|- id="2002 GX6" bgcolor=#FA8072
| 1 ||  || HUN || 19.7 || data-sort-value="0.34" | 340 m || multiple || 2002–2017 || 27 Apr 2017 || 62 || align=left | Disc.: SpacewatchAlt.: 2012 GV23 || 
|- id="2002 GF8" bgcolor=#FFC2E0
| 4 ||  || AMO || 20.6 || data-sort-value="0.27" | 270 m || single || 84 days || 02 Jul 2002 || 63 || align=left | Disc.: NEAT || 
|- id="2002 GG8" bgcolor=#FFC2E0
| 7 ||  || APO || 24.7 || data-sort-value="0.041" | 41 m || single || 21 days || 02 May 2002 || 25 || align=left | Disc.: LINEAR || 
|- id="2002 GJ8" bgcolor=#FFC2E0
| 2 ||  || AMO || 19.4 || data-sort-value="0.47" | 470 m || multiple || 2002–2012 || 15 Dec 2012 || 112 || align=left | Disc.: NEAT || 
|- id="2002 GL8" bgcolor=#FA8072
| 0 ||  || MCA || 20.10 || data-sort-value="0.28" | 280 m || multiple || 2002–2019 || 25 Jun 2019 || 81 || align=left | Disc.: NEAT || 
|- id="2002 GS8" bgcolor=#E9E9E9
| 0 ||  || MBA-M || 17.50 || 1.3 km || multiple || 2002–2021 || 06 Nov 2021 || 135 || align=left | Disc.: NEATAlt.: 2010 GO58 || 
|- id="2002 GZ8" bgcolor=#FFC2E0
| 0 ||  || AMO || 18.73 || data-sort-value="0.64" | 640 m || multiple || 2001–2021 || 12 May 2021 || 775 || align=left | Disc.: LINEARPotentially hazardous object || 
|- id="2002 GR9" bgcolor=#FA8072
| – ||  || MCA || 18.6 || data-sort-value="0.57" | 570 m || single || 35 days || 16 May 2002 || 23 || align=left | Disc.: LINEAR || 
|- id="2002 GS9" bgcolor=#FA8072
| 0 ||  || HUN || 18.61 || data-sort-value="0.56" | 560 m || multiple || 2002–2022 || 21 Jan 2022 || 88 || align=left | Disc.: LINEAR || 
|- id="2002 GV9" bgcolor=#E9E9E9
| 0 ||  || MBA-M || 17.51 || 1.3 km || multiple || 2002–2020 || 16 Sep 2020 || 52 || align=left | Disc.: LINEAR || 
|- id="2002 GY9" bgcolor=#FA8072
| 0 ||  || MCA || 18.88 || data-sort-value="0.50" | 500 m || multiple || 2002–2021 || 28 Jun 2021 || 196 || align=left | Disc.: LINEAR || 
|- id="2002 GD10" bgcolor=#FFC2E0
| 0 ||  || AMO || 22.71 || data-sort-value="0.10" | 100 m || multiple || 2002–2021 || 30 Oct 2021 || 86 || align=left | Disc.: LINEAR || 
|- id="2002 GN15" bgcolor=#FA8072
| 0 ||  || MCA || 18.14 || data-sort-value="0.70" | 700 m || multiple || 2002–2021 || 13 Sep 2021 || 132 || align=left | Disc.: LINEARAlt.: 2013 CR222 || 
|- id="2002 GH18" bgcolor=#E9E9E9
| 0 ||  || MBA-M || 16.9 || 1.2 km || multiple || 2002–2021 || 08 Jan 2021 || 169 || align=left | Disc.: Spacewatch || 
|- id="2002 GM18" bgcolor=#fefefe
| 4 ||  || HUN || 19.6 || data-sort-value="0.36" | 360 m || multiple || 2002–2019 || 04 Nov 2019 || 24 || align=left | Disc.: LPL/Spacewatch II || 
|- id="2002 GM25" bgcolor=#E9E9E9
| 2 ||  || MBA-M || 17.8 || 1.2 km || multiple || 2002–2015 || 23 Mar 2015 || 46 || align=left | Disc.: SpacewatchAlt.: 2015 BT35 || 
|- id="2002 GR26" bgcolor=#E9E9E9
| 0 ||  || MBA-M || 16.70 || 1.9 km || multiple || 2002–2021 || 30 Sep 2021 || 101 || align=left | Disc.: NEAT || 
|- id="2002 GL27" bgcolor=#d6d6d6
| 0 ||  || MBA-O || 16.72 || 2.5 km || multiple || 2002–2021 || 03 Sep 2021 || 118 || align=left | Disc.: Cerro TololoAdded on 17 January 2021Alt.: 2016 TA41 || 
|- id="2002 GN27" bgcolor=#d6d6d6
| – ||  || MBA-O || 17.0 || 2.2 km || single || 18 days || 07 Apr 2002 || 6 || align=left | Disc.: Cerro Tololo || 
|- id="2002 GW27" bgcolor=#d6d6d6
| 1 ||  || MBA-O || 17.8 || 1.5 km || multiple || 2002–2019 || 29 Sep 2019 || 27 || align=left | Disc.: Cerro TololoAdded on 30 September 2021 || 
|- id="2002 GY27" bgcolor=#d6d6d6
| 0 ||  || MBA-O || 17.1 || 2.1 km || multiple || 1999–2021 || 18 Jan 2021 || 105 || align=left | Disc.: Cerro TololoAlt.: 2014 UR107 || 
|- id="2002 GC28" bgcolor=#d6d6d6
| 0 ||  || MBA-O || 17.3 || 1.9 km || multiple || 2002-2022 || 29 Nov 2022 || 65 || align=left | Disc.: Cerro TololoAlt.: 2005 SP229 || 
|- id="2002 GG28" bgcolor=#E9E9E9
| E ||  || MBA-M || 16.4 || 2.9 km || single || 2 days || 08 Apr 2002 || 6 || align=left | Disc.: Cerro Tololo || 
|- id="2002 GJ28" bgcolor=#E9E9E9
| 0 ||  || MBA-M || 17.21 || 2.0 km || multiple || 2002–2021 || 13 May 2021 || 120 || align=left | Disc.: Cerro Tololo || 
|- id="2002 GK28" bgcolor=#E9E9E9
| 0 ||  || MBA-M || 18.5 || data-sort-value="0.59" | 590 m || multiple || 2002–2020 || 15 Oct 2020 || 25 || align=left | Disc.: Cerro TololoAdded on 11 May 2021 || 
|- id="2002 GO28" bgcolor=#d6d6d6
| E ||  || MBA-O || 17.3 || 1.9 km || single || 3 days || 09 Apr 2002 || 8 || align=left | Disc.: Cerro Tololo || 
|- id="2002 GR28" bgcolor=#d6d6d6
| E ||  || HIL || 15.5 || 4.4 km || single || 3 days || 09 Apr 2002 || 8 || align=left | Disc.: Cerro Tololo || 
|- id="2002 GA29" bgcolor=#fefefe
| 2 ||  || MBA-I || 19.0 || data-sort-value="0.47" | 470 m || multiple || 2002–2020 || 29 Apr 2020 || 29 || align=left | Disc.: Cerro Tololo || 
|- id="2002 GB29" bgcolor=#E9E9E9
| 4 ||  || MBA-M || 18.5 || data-sort-value="0.84" | 840 m || multiple || 2002–2020 || 17 Jul 2020 || 19 || align=left | Disc.: Cerro TololoAdded on 9 March 2021 || 
|- id="2002 GD29" bgcolor=#d6d6d6
| 0 ||  || MBA-O || 17.61 || 1.7 km || multiple || 2002–2020 || 16 Sep 2020 || 32 || align=left | Disc.: Cerro TololoAdded on 17 January 2021 || 
|- id="2002 GG29" bgcolor=#C2FFFF
| E ||  || JT || 14.7 || 6.4 km || single || 2 days || 08 Apr 2002 || 6 || align=left | Disc.: Cerro TololoGreek camp (L4) || 
|- id="2002 GK29" bgcolor=#E9E9E9
| 0 ||  || MBA-M || 18.0 || 1.1 km || multiple || 2002–2021 || 30 Oct 2021 || 38 || align=left | Disc.: Cerro TololoAdded on 5 November 2021 || 
|- id="2002 GM29" bgcolor=#d6d6d6
| – ||  || MBA-O || 17.5 || 1.8 km || single || 3 days || 09 Apr 2002 || 8 || align=left | Disc.: Cerro Tololo || 
|- id="2002 GP29" bgcolor=#fefefe
| E ||  || MBA-I || 18.1 || data-sort-value="0.71" | 710 m || single || 2 days || 09 Apr 2002 || 6 || align=left | Disc.: Cerro Tololo || 
|- id="2002 GA30" bgcolor=#E9E9E9
| 0 ||  || MBA-M || 17.97 || data-sort-value="0.76" | 760 m || multiple || 2002–2022 || 07 Jan 2022 || 48 || align=left | Disc.: Cerro Tololo || 
|- id="2002 GC30" bgcolor=#fefefe
| 0 ||  || MBA-I || 17.8 || data-sort-value="0.82" | 820 m || multiple || 2002–2021 || 06 Jan 2021 || 148 || align=left | Disc.: Cerro TololoAlt.: 2015 BJ259 || 
|- id="2002 GD30" bgcolor=#E9E9E9
| 0 ||  || MBA-M || 17.2 || 2.0 km || multiple || 1997–2021 || 09 Jun 2021 || 90 || align=left | Disc.: Cerro TololoAdded on 22 July 2020Alt.: 2009 VA97 || 
|- id="2002 GT30" bgcolor=#E9E9E9
| 0 ||  || MBA-M || 18.03 || 1.0 km || multiple || 2002–2021 || 10 Nov 2021 || 50 || align=left | Disc.: Cerro TololoAdded on 24 December 2021 || 
|- id="2002 GU30" bgcolor=#E9E9E9
| 3 ||  || MBA-M || 18.2 || data-sort-value="0.96" | 960 m || multiple || 2002–2015 || 22 Mar 2015 || 14 || align=left | Disc.: Cerro TololoAdded on 21 August 2021 || 
|- id="2002 GW30" bgcolor=#E9E9E9
| 0 ||  || MBA-M || 17.9 || data-sort-value="0.78" | 780 m || multiple || 2002–2020 || 17 Sep 2020 || 42 || align=left | Disc.: Cerro TololoAdded on 17 January 2021 || 
|- id="2002 GY30" bgcolor=#fefefe
| 1 ||  || MBA-I || 19.2 || data-sort-value="0.43" | 430 m || multiple || 2002–2020 || 22 Jun 2020 || 24 || align=left | Disc.: Cerro TololoAlt.: 2017 OE55 || 
|- id="2002 GD31" bgcolor=#fefefe
| 0 ||  || MBA-I || 18.9 || data-sort-value="0.49" | 490 m || multiple || 2002–2016 || 27 Aug 2016 || 47 || align=left | Disc.: Cerro Tololo || 
|- id="2002 GH31" bgcolor=#E9E9E9
| 0 ||  || MBA-M || 17.6 || 1.3 km || multiple || 2002–2020 || 08 Nov 2020 || 62 || align=left | Disc.: Cerro TololoAlt.: 2003 WU177 || 
|- id="2002 GM31" bgcolor=#d6d6d6
| 0 ||  || MBA-O || 17.36 || 2 km || multiple || 2002-2021 || 04 Oct 2021 || 41 || align=left | Disc.: Cerro TololoAlt.: 2015 PO122 || 
|- id="2002 GP31" bgcolor=#C2FFFF
| 0 ||  || JT || 15.26 || 4.9 km || multiple || 2002–2021 || 26 Nov 2021 || 139 || align=left | Disc.: Kitt Peak Obs.Greek camp (L4)Alt.: 2002 FX18 || 
|- id="2002 GR31" bgcolor=#E9E9E9
| – ||  || MBA-M || 16.7 || 2.5 km || single || 19 days || 11 Apr 2002 || 9 || align=left | Disc.: Cerro Tololo || 
|- id="2002 GS31" bgcolor=#fefefe
| 0 ||  || MBA-I || 18.87 || data-sort-value="0.50" | 500 m || multiple || 2002–2022 || 07 Jan 2022 || 53 || align=left | Disc.: Cerro TololoAlt.: 2014 WO60, 2017 PN9 || 
|- id="2002 GW31" bgcolor=#C2E0FF
| 4 ||  || TNO || 7.12 || 178 km || multiple || 2002–2021 || 12 May 2021 || 22 || align=left | Disc.: Cerro TololoLoUTNOs, plutino || 
|- id="2002 GX31" bgcolor=#C2E0FF
| E ||  || TNO || 7.0 || 137 km || single || 4 days || 10 Apr 2002 || 5 || align=left | Disc.: Cerro TololoLoUTNOs, cubewano? || 
|- id="2002 GY31" bgcolor=#C2E0FF
| E ||  || TNO || 6.5 || 172 km || single || 4 days || 10 Apr 2002 || 5 || align=left | Disc.: Cerro TololoLoUTNOs, cubewano? || 
|- id="2002 GA32" bgcolor=#C2E0FF
| 3 ||  || TNO || 7.7 || 109 km || multiple || 2001–2008 || 18 May 2008 || 19 || align=left | Disc.: Cerro TololoLoUTNOs, SDO || 
|- id="2002 GB32" bgcolor=#C2E0FF
| 0 ||  || TNO || 7.8 || 104 km || multiple || 2002–2017 || 17 Jun 2017 || 30 || align=left | Disc.: Cerro TololoLoUTNOs, SDO, BR-mag: 1.39; taxonomy: IR || 
|- id="2002 GC32" bgcolor=#C2E0FF
| E ||  || TNO || 7.3 || 119 km || single || 4 days || 11 Apr 2002 || 7 || align=left | Disc.: Cerro TololoLoUTNOs, cubewano? || 
|- id="2002 GE32" bgcolor=#C2E0FF
| 3 ||  || TNO || 7.8 || 130 km || multiple || 2002–2018 || 19 May 2018 || 16 || align=left | Disc.: Cerro TololoLoUTNOs, plutinoAlt.: 2004 NE32 || 
|- id="2002 GH32" bgcolor=#C2E0FF
| 3 ||  || TNO || 6.26 || 230 km || multiple || 2002–2021 || 09 Jul 2021 || 54 || align=left | Disc.: Cerro TololoLoUTNOs, other TNO, albedo: 0.075; BR-mag: 1.56; taxonomy: IR || 
|- id="2002 GK32" bgcolor=#C2E0FF
| E ||  || TNO || 6.4 || 180 km || single || 1 day || 09 Apr 2002 || 3 || align=left | Disc.: Cerro TololoLoUTNOs, cubewano? || 
|- id="2002 GL32" bgcolor=#C2E0FF
| 3 ||  || TNO || 7.6 || 143 km || multiple || 2002–2013 || 13 Mar 2013 || 15 || align=left | Disc.: Cerro TololoLoUTNOs, plutino || 
|- id="2002 GM32" bgcolor=#C2E0FF
| E ||  || TNO || 9.0 || 75 km || single || 4 days || 10 Apr 2002 || 5 || align=left | Disc.: Cerro TololoLoUTNOs, plutino? || 
|- id="2002 GN32" bgcolor=#C2E0FF
| E ||  || TNO || 6.3 || 260 km || single || 66 days || 11 Jun 2002 || 8 || align=left | Disc.: Cerro TololoLoUTNOs, plutino? || 
|- id="2002 GO32" bgcolor=#C2E0FF
| E ||  || TNO || 7.6 || 143 km || single || 1 day || 07 Apr 2002 || 3 || align=left | Disc.: Cerro TololoLoUTNOs, plutino? || 
|- id="2002 GP32" bgcolor=#C2E0FF
| 0 ||  || TNO || 7.1 || 201 km || multiple || 2002–2015 || 06 Aug 2015 || 110 || align=left | Disc.: Cerro TololoLoUTNOs, res2:5, albedo: 0.091; BR-mag: 1.61; taxonomy: U || 
|- id="2002 GQ32" bgcolor=#C2E0FF
| E ||  || TNO || 7.7 || 136 km || single || 4 days || 11 Apr 2002 || 5 || align=left | Disc.: Cerro TololoLoUTNOs, plutino? || 
|- id="2002 GR32" bgcolor=#C2E0FF
| 4 ||  || TNO || 8.6 || 90 km || multiple || 2002–2017 || 02 May 2017 || 16 || align=left | Disc.: Cerro TololoLoUTNOs, plutino || 
|- id="2002 GS32" bgcolor=#C2E0FF
| 3 ||  || TNO || 7.6 || 104 km || multiple || 2002–2014 || 30 May 2014 || 21 || align=left | Disc.: Cerro TololoLoUTNOs, cubewano?, BR-mag: 1.76; taxonomy: RR || 
|- id="2002 GT32" bgcolor=#C2E0FF
| E ||  || TNO || 8.1 || 113 km || single || 1 day || 09 Apr 2002 || 4 || align=left | Disc.: Cerro TololoLoUTNOs, plutino? || 
|- id="2002 GU32" bgcolor=#C2E0FF
| E ||  || TNO || 6.9 || 197 km || single || 70 days || 17 Jun 2002 || 5 || align=left | Disc.: Cerro TololoLoUTNOs, plutino? || 
|- id="2002 GV32" bgcolor=#C2E0FF
| 1 ||  || TNO || 7.4 || 157 km || multiple || 2002–2016 || 18 Aug 2016 || 79 || align=left | Disc.: Cerro TololoLoUTNOs, plutino, BR-mag: 1.96; taxonomy: RR || 
|- id="2002 GW32" bgcolor=#C2E0FF
| 3 ||  || TNO || 7.5 || 114 km || multiple || 2002–2016 || 29 May 2016 || 18 || align=left | Disc.: Cerro TololoLoUTNOs, res4:5 || 
|- id="2002 GY32" bgcolor=#C2E0FF
| 1 ||  || TNO || 7.4 || 157 km || multiple || 2001–2017 || 15 Jul 2017 || 68 || align=left | Disc.: Cerro TololoLoUTNOs, plutino || 
|- id="2002 GA33" bgcolor=#C2E0FF
| E ||  || TNO || 8.6 || 65 km || single || 1 day || 08 Apr 2002 || 3 || align=left | Disc.: Mauna Kea Obs.LoUTNOs, cubewano? || 
|- id="2002 GB33" bgcolor=#C2E0FF
| E ||  || TNO || 7.8 || 95 km || single || 1 day || 08 Apr 2002 || 3 || align=left | Disc.: Mauna Kea Obs.LoUTNOs, cubewano? || 
|- id="2002 GK36" bgcolor=#fefefe
| 0 ||  || MBA-I || 18.25 || data-sort-value="0.67" | 670 m || multiple || 2002–2021 || 11 Sep 2021 || 53 || align=left | Disc.: SpacewatchAdded on 17 June 2021Alt.: 2013 EP174 || 
|- id="2002 GN47" bgcolor=#E9E9E9
| 0 ||  || MBA-M || 17.12 || 2.1 km || multiple || 2002–2021 || 08 Sep 2021 || 88 || align=left | Disc.: SpacewatchAlt.: 2015 GD2 || 
|- id="2002 GM50" bgcolor=#fefefe
| 0 ||  || MBA-I || 17.1 || 1.1 km || multiple || 1995–2020 || 12 Dec 2020 || 247 || align=left | Disc.: NEATAlt.: 2015 AE106 || 
|- id="2002 GN51" bgcolor=#E9E9E9
| 0 ||  || MBA-M || 17.89 || 1.1 km || multiple || 2002–2021 || 03 Oct 2021 || 60 || align=left | Disc.: NEAT || 
|- id="2002 GS54" bgcolor=#d6d6d6
| 0 ||  || MBA-O || 16.7 || 2.5 km || multiple || 2002–2020 || 23 Oct 2020 || 93 || align=left | Disc.: NEAT || 
|- id="2002 GR55" bgcolor=#fefefe
| 0 ||  || MBA-I || 18.24 || data-sort-value="0.67" | 670 m || multiple || 2002–2021 || 30 Nov 2021 || 101 || align=left | Disc.: NEAT || 
|- id="2002 GF57" bgcolor=#d6d6d6
| 0 ||  || MBA-O || 17.03 || 2.2 km || multiple || 2002–2021 || 17 Aug 2021 || 32 || align=left | Disc.: LPL/Spacewatch IIAlt.: 2008 EV49 || 
|- id="2002 GG60" bgcolor=#fefefe
| 0 ||  || MBA-I || 18.70 || data-sort-value="0.54" | 540 m || multiple || 2002–2021 || 03 May 2021 || 53 || align=left | Disc.: LPL/Spacewatch II || 
|- id="2002 GV62" bgcolor=#E9E9E9
| 0 ||  || MBA-M || 16.6 || 2.7 km || multiple || 2002–2020 || 31 Jan 2020 || 101 || align=left | Disc.: NEATAlt.: 2013 TZ112 || 
|- id="2002 GA63" bgcolor=#E9E9E9
| 0 ||  || MBA-M || 17.01 || 2.3 km || multiple || 2002–2021 || 02 Dec 2021 || 216 || align=left | Disc.: NEATAlt.: 2010 JL54, 2015 MW30 || 
|- id="2002 GM63" bgcolor=#fefefe
| 0 ||  || MBA-I || 18.2 || data-sort-value="0.68" | 680 m || multiple || 2002–2019 || 28 Aug 2019 || 120 || align=left | Disc.: NEATAlt.: 2010 XV31 || 
|- id="2002 GP89" bgcolor=#fefefe
| 0 ||  || MBA-I || 17.85 || data-sort-value="0.80" | 800 m || multiple || 2002–2021 || 07 Nov 2021 || 188 || align=left | Disc.: NEATAlt.: 2009 DA19, 2014 WQ129, 2016 BA79 || 
|- id="2002 GD90" bgcolor=#E9E9E9
| 1 ||  || MBA-M || 18.0 || 1.1 km || multiple || 2002–2019 || 04 Jan 2019 || 28 || align=left | Disc.: LPL/Spacewatch II || 
|- id="2002 GK90" bgcolor=#fefefe
| 0 ||  || MBA-I || 17.69 || data-sort-value="0.86" | 860 m || multiple || 2002–2021 || 05 Jul 2021 || 177 || align=left | Disc.: NEATAlt.: 2013 GV103 || 
|- id="2002 GO104" bgcolor=#d6d6d6
| 0 ||  || MBA-O || 16.66 || 2.6 km || multiple || 2002–2021 || 06 Apr 2021 || 121 || align=left | Disc.: LINEAR || 
|- id="2002 GF108" bgcolor=#E9E9E9
| 0 ||  || MBA-M || 17.28 || 1.5 km || multiple || 2002–2021 || 11 Nov 2021 || 156 || align=left | Disc.: LINEAR || 
|- id="2002 GK110" bgcolor=#fefefe
| 1 ||  || MBA-I || 18.3 || data-sort-value="0.65" | 650 m || multiple || 2002–2020 || 14 Jun 2020 || 103 || align=left | Disc.: LINEARAlt.: 2009 CO42 || 
|- id="2002 GR120" bgcolor=#fefefe
| 0 ||  || MBA-I || 17.9 || data-sort-value="0.78" | 780 m || multiple || 2002–2021 || 01 Oct 2021 || 120 || align=left | Disc.: NEATAlt.: 2010 KB30 || 
|- id="2002 GX132" bgcolor=#d6d6d6
| 0 ||  || MBA-O || 17.0 || 2.2 km || multiple || 2002–2019 || 27 Sep 2019 || 85 || align=left | Disc.: LINEARAlt.: 2007 DT73, 2007 EQ127 || 
|- id="2002 GK135" bgcolor=#E9E9E9
| 0 ||  || MBA-M || 17.91 || data-sort-value="0.78" | 780 m || multiple || 2002–2022 || 26 Jan 2022 || 95 || align=left | Disc.: LINEARAlt.: 2006 EB15, 2015 PZ170 || 
|- id="2002 GW139" bgcolor=#fefefe
| 1 ||  || MBA-I || 18.6 || data-sort-value="0.57" | 570 m || multiple || 2002–2019 || 03 Jul 2019 || 75 || align=left | Disc.: LPL/Spacewatch IIAlt.: 2015 BG147 || 
|- id="2002 GX139" bgcolor=#E9E9E9
| 0 ||  || MBA-M || 17.5 || 1.3 km || multiple || 2002–2020 || 23 Oct 2020 || 31 || align=left | Disc.: LPL/Spacewatch IIAdded on 29 January 2022 || 
|- id="2002 GN147" bgcolor=#fefefe
| 0 ||  || MBA-I || 17.8 || data-sort-value="0.82" | 820 m || multiple || 2002–2019 || 17 Dec 2019 || 62 || align=left | Disc.: NEAT || 
|- id="2002 GT147" bgcolor=#fefefe
| 0 ||  || MBA-I || 17.75 || data-sort-value="0.84" | 840 m || multiple || 2000–2021 || 07 May 2021 || 190 || align=left | Disc.: NEATAlt.: 2013 YU21, 2016 UG28 || 
|- id="2002 GX149" bgcolor=#fefefe
| 0 ||  || MBA-I || 17.84 || data-sort-value="0.80" | 800 m || multiple || 2002–2021 || 15 Jun 2021 || 132 || align=left | Disc.: LINEARAlt.: 2017 KS27 || 
|- id="2002 GB150" bgcolor=#E9E9E9
| 1 ||  || MBA-M || 17.7 || data-sort-value="0.86" | 860 m || multiple || 2002–2018 || 25 Jan 2018 || 31 || align=left | Disc.: LINEARAlt.: 2010 KM136 || 
|- id="2002 GJ156" bgcolor=#fefefe
| 1 ||  || MBA-I || 18.5 || data-sort-value="0.59" | 590 m || multiple || 2002–2019 || 29 Jun 2019 || 84 || align=left | Disc.: NEAT || 
|- id="2002 GS157" bgcolor=#fefefe
| 0 ||  || MBA-I || 18.4 || data-sort-value="0.62" | 620 m || multiple || 2002–2020 || 17 May 2020 || 69 || align=left | Disc.: NEATAdded on 22 July 2020 || 
|- id="2002 GW157" bgcolor=#E9E9E9
| 0 ||  || MBA-M || 17.1 || 1.6 km || multiple || 2002–2017 || 23 Dec 2017 || 90 || align=left | Disc.: NEATAlt.: 2015 FH207 || 
|- id="2002 GR160" bgcolor=#d6d6d6
| 0 ||  || MBA-O || 16.7 || 2.5 km || multiple || 2002–2020 || 18 Aug 2020 || 80 || align=left | Disc.: NEAT || 
|- id="2002 GL162" bgcolor=#E9E9E9
| 0 ||  || MBA-M || 17.2 || 1.1 km || multiple || 2002–2020 || 17 Sep 2020 || 77 || align=left | Disc.: NEATAlt.: 2015 MU3 || 
|- id="2002 GP163" bgcolor=#C2FFFF
| 0 ||  || JT || 14.29 || 7.7 km || multiple || 2001–2021 || 25 Nov 2021 || 248 || align=left | Disc.: LPL/Spacewatch IIAdded on 17 January 2021Greek camp (L4) || 
|- id="2002 GH166" bgcolor=#C2E0FF
| 1 ||  || TNO || 7.3 || 164 km || multiple || 2000–2018 || 13 Apr 2018 || 89 || align=left | Disc.: Cerro TololoLoUTNOs, plutino || 
|- id="2002 GJ166" bgcolor=#C2E0FF
| E ||  || TNO || 7.9 || 124 km || single || 29 days || 08 May 2002 || 4 || align=left | Disc.: Cerro TololoLoUTNOs, plutino? || 
|- id="2002 GL175" bgcolor=#fefefe
| 0 ||  || MBA-I || 17.7 || data-sort-value="0.86" | 860 m || multiple || 2000–2020 || 16 Dec 2020 || 176 || align=left | Disc.: LINEARAlt.: 2005 CC61, 2010 XV33, 2015 HH14 || 
|- id="2002 GB177" bgcolor=#d6d6d6
| 0 ||  || MBA-O || 17.18 || 2.0 km || multiple || 2002–2021 || 02 Dec 2021 || 85 || align=left | Disc.: Cerro TololoAdded on 24 December 2021 || 
|- id="2002 GL178" bgcolor=#d6d6d6
| 0 ||  || MBA-O || 17.17 || 2.0 km || multiple || 2002–2021 || 25 Nov 2021 || 55 || align=left | Disc.: AstrovirtelAdded on 24 December 2021 || 
|- id="2002 GM178" bgcolor=#fefefe
| 2 ||  || HUN || 19.0 || data-sort-value="0.47" | 470 m || multiple || 2002–2021 || 06 Mar 2021 || 30 || align=left | Disc.: AstrovirtelAdded on 17 June 2021Alt.: 2021 AA19 || 
|- id="2002 GQ178" bgcolor=#E9E9E9
| 0 ||  || MBA-M || 17.7 || data-sort-value="0.86" | 860 m || multiple || 2002–2019 || 06 Jul 2019 || 60 || align=left | Disc.: NEATAlt.: 2010 LP99 || 
|- id="2002 GX179" bgcolor=#E9E9E9
| 1 ||  || MBA-M || 17.4 || 1.4 km || multiple || 2002–2020 || 10 Nov 2020 || 59 || align=left | Disc.: NEAT || 
|- id="2002 GE180" bgcolor=#fefefe
| 1 ||  || MBA-I || 18.6 || data-sort-value="0.57" | 570 m || multiple || 1995–2020 || 12 Sep 2020 || 65 || align=left | Disc.: NEAT || 
|- id="2002 GU180" bgcolor=#d6d6d6
| 0 ||  || MBA-O || 16.30 || 3.1 km || multiple || 2002–2021 || 26 Oct 2021 || 69 || align=left | Disc.: NEAT || 
|- id="2002 GV180" bgcolor=#E9E9E9
| 0 ||  || MBA-M || 17.38 || data-sort-value="0.99" | 990 m || multiple || 2002–2022 || 27 Jan 2022 || 131 || align=left | Disc.: NEATAlt.: 2014 BR20 || 
|- id="2002 GX180" bgcolor=#d6d6d6
| 1 ||  || MBA-O || 17.6 || 1.7 km || multiple || 2002–2018 || 18 Mar 2018 || 41 || align=left | Disc.: NEAT || 
|- id="2002 GE181" bgcolor=#E9E9E9
| 0 ||  || MBA-M || 17.19 || 1.5 km || multiple || 2002–2021 || 02 Dec 2021 || 152 || align=left | Disc.: NEATAlt.: 2002 JP149 || 
|- id="2002 GL181" bgcolor=#fefefe
| 0 ||  || MBA-I || 18.42 || data-sort-value="0.62" | 620 m || multiple || 2002–2021 || 13 Jul 2021 || 56 || align=left | Disc.: SpacewatchAlt.: 2014 SA228 || 
|- id="2002 GO181" bgcolor=#E9E9E9
| 0 ||  || MBA-M || 16.9 || 2.3 km || multiple || 2002–2020 || 30 Jan 2020 || 77 || align=left | Disc.: NEATAlt.: 2016 GX224 || 
|- id="2002 GG182" bgcolor=#fefefe
| 0 ||  || MBA-I || 17.5 || data-sort-value="0.94" | 940 m || multiple || 2002–2021 || 07 Jun 2021 || 160 || align=left | Disc.: NEATAlt.: 2017 DC87 || 
|- id="2002 GF183" bgcolor=#d6d6d6
| 0 ||  || MBA-O || 15.8 || 3.9 km || multiple || 2001–2020 || 06 Dec 2020 || 149 || align=left | Disc.: NEATAlt.: 2015 XY156 || 
|- id="2002 GK183" bgcolor=#fefefe
| – ||  || MBA-I || 19.8 || data-sort-value="0.33" | 330 m || single || 5 days || 09 Apr 2002 || 8 || align=left | Disc.: LPL/Spacewatch II || 
|- id="2002 GA184" bgcolor=#E9E9E9
| 0 ||  || MBA-M || 16.7 || 2.5 km || multiple || 2002–2020 || 31 Jan 2020 || 102 || align=left | Disc.: NEAT || 
|- id="2002 GO184" bgcolor=#E9E9E9
| 0 ||  || MBA-M || 17.25 || 2.0 km || multiple || 1999–2021 || 27 Nov 2021 || 152 || align=left | Disc.: NEATAlt.: 2015 DS187 || 
|- id="2002 GY184" bgcolor=#E9E9E9
| 0 ||  || MBA-M || 17.59 || 1.7 km || multiple || 1993–2021 || 06 Nov 2021 || 93 || align=left | Disc.: NEATAlt.: 2011 FC157 || 
|- id="2002 GG185" bgcolor=#fefefe
| 0 ||  || MBA-I || 18.57 || data-sort-value="0.57" | 570 m || multiple || 2002–2021 || 02 Dec 2021 || 48 || align=left | Disc.: NEATAlt.: 2009 JX7 || 
|- id="2002 GO185" bgcolor=#fefefe
| 0 ||  || MBA-I || 18.57 || data-sort-value="0.57" | 570 m || multiple || 2002–2021 || 06 Oct 2021 || 49 || align=left | Disc.: NEATAlt.: 2020 GB19 || 
|- id="2002 GR185" bgcolor=#E9E9E9
| 0 ||  || MBA-M || 18.17 || data-sort-value="0.69" | 690 m || multiple || 2002–2021 || 28 Nov 2021 || 45 || align=left | Disc.: NEAT || 
|- id="2002 GL186" bgcolor=#E9E9E9
| 0 ||  || MBA-M || 17.6 || data-sort-value="0.90" | 900 m || multiple || 2002–2020 || 10 Dec 2020 || 53 || align=left | Disc.: NEAT || 
|- id="2002 GN186" bgcolor=#fefefe
| 1 ||  || HUN || 18.2 || data-sort-value="0.68" | 680 m || multiple || 2002–2021 || 09 May 2021 || 55 || align=left | Disc.: NEATAdded on 21 August 2021Alt.: 2011 SM328 || 
|- id="2002 GR186" bgcolor=#fefefe
| 0 ||  || MBA-I || 17.9 || data-sort-value="0.78" | 780 m || multiple || 2002–2020 || 24 Jan 2020 || 76 || align=left | Disc.: NEATAlt.: 2014 SY21 || 
|- id="2002 GS186" bgcolor=#d6d6d6
| 0 ||  || MBA-O || 16.2 || 3.2 km || multiple || 2002–2020 || 13 Nov 2020 || 87 || align=left | Disc.: NEATAlt.: 2009 UJ8 || 
|- id="2002 GU186" bgcolor=#fefefe
| 0 ||  || MBA-I || 18.2 || data-sort-value="0.68" | 680 m || multiple || 2002–2021 || 04 Jan 2021 || 115 || align=left | Disc.: NEATAlt.: 2012 LQ20 || 
|- id="2002 GK187" bgcolor=#fefefe
| 0 ||  || MBA-I || 18.56 || data-sort-value="0.58" | 580 m || multiple || 2002–2021 || 01 Jul 2021 || 69 || align=left | Disc.: NEAT || 
|- id="2002 GN187" bgcolor=#fefefe
| 0 ||  || MBA-I || 18.4 || data-sort-value="0.62" | 620 m || multiple || 2002–2017 || 05 May 2017 || 35 || align=left | Disc.: NEATAlt.: 2013 EJ179 || 
|- id="2002 GV187" bgcolor=#d6d6d6
| 0 ||  || MBA-O || 16.56 || 2.7 km || multiple || 2002–2021 || 09 Sep 2021 || 85 || align=left | Disc.: NEAT || 
|- id="2002 GZ187" bgcolor=#E9E9E9
| 0 ||  || MBA-M || 17.70 || data-sort-value="0.86" | 860 m || multiple || 2002–2022 || 26 Jan 2022 || 122 || align=left | Disc.: NEATAlt.: 2014 DF43 || 
|- id="2002 GG188" bgcolor=#d6d6d6
| 0 ||  || MBA-O || 16.37 || 3.0 km || multiple || 2002–2021 || 30 Nov 2021 || 99 || align=left | Disc.: NEATAlt.: 2015 RN198 || 
|- id="2002 GH188" bgcolor=#fefefe
| 0 ||  || MBA-I || 17.72 || data-sort-value="0.85" | 850 m || multiple || 2002–2021 || 11 Jun 2021 || 141 || align=left | Disc.: NEAT || 
|- id="2002 GA189" bgcolor=#fefefe
| 1 ||  || MBA-I || 18.8 || data-sort-value="0.52" | 520 m || multiple || 2002–2019 || 25 Oct 2019 || 30 || align=left | Disc.: NEAT || 
|- id="2002 GF189" bgcolor=#E9E9E9
| 0 ||  || MBA-M || 17.23 || 1.5 km || multiple || 2002–2021 || 27 Nov 2021 || 127 || align=left | Disc.: NEAT || 
|- id="2002 GG189" bgcolor=#fefefe
| 0 ||  || MBA-I || 18.1 || data-sort-value="0.71" | 710 m || multiple || 2002–2019 || 02 Nov 2019 || 100 || align=left | Disc.: NEAT || 
|- id="2002 GH189" bgcolor=#fefefe
| E ||  || MBA-I || 18.8 || data-sort-value="0.52" | 520 m || single || 6 days || 14 Apr 2002 || 9 || align=left | Disc.: NEAT || 
|- id="2002 GJ189" bgcolor=#fefefe
| 0 ||  || MBA-I || 17.9 || data-sort-value="0.78" | 780 m || multiple || 2002–2020 || 14 Dec 2020 || 79 || align=left | Disc.: NEAT || 
|- id="2002 GM189" bgcolor=#d6d6d6
| 0 ||  || MBA-O || 16.9 || 2.3 km || multiple || 2002–2019 || 02 Jun 2019 || 55 || align=left | Disc.: NEAT || 
|- id="2002 GX189" bgcolor=#fefefe
| 0 ||  || MBA-I || 18.4 || data-sort-value="0.62" | 620 m || multiple || 2002–2021 || 17 Jan 2021 || 89 || align=left | Disc.: NEAT || 
|- id="2002 GY189" bgcolor=#fefefe
| 3 ||  || MBA-I || 18.7 || data-sort-value="0.54" | 540 m || multiple || 2002–2016 || 03 Apr 2016 || 40 || align=left | Disc.: NEAT || 
|- id="2002 GA190" bgcolor=#E9E9E9
| 0 ||  || MBA-M || 15.9 || 3.7 km || multiple || 2002–2021 || 09 Jun 2021 || 314 || align=left | Disc.: NEAT || 
|- id="2002 GH190" bgcolor=#d6d6d6
| 0 ||  || MBA-O || 15.9 || 3.7 km || multiple || 2002–2020 || 17 Dec 2020 || 164 || align=left | Disc.: NEATAlt.: 2009 RU34 || 
|- id="2002 GN190" bgcolor=#fefefe
| 0 ||  || MBA-I || 16.95 || 1.2 km || multiple || 2002–2021 || 06 May 2021 || 246 || align=left | Disc.: NEAT || 
|- id="2002 GU190" bgcolor=#d6d6d6
| 0 ||  || MBA-O || 16.67 || 2.6 km || multiple || 2002–2021 || 04 Oct 2021 || 53 || align=left | Disc.: NEAT || 
|- id="2002 GH191" bgcolor=#FA8072
| 0 ||  || HUN || 17.61 || data-sort-value="0.89" | 890 m || multiple || 2002–2021 || 31 Aug 2021 || 310 || align=left | Disc.: NEATAlt.: 2010 GH33, 2015 DS155 || 
|- id="2002 GL191" bgcolor=#E9E9E9
| 0 ||  || MBA-M || 15.80 || 3.9 km || multiple || 2002–2021 || 06 Dec 2021 || 446 || align=left | Disc.: NEATAlt.: 2010 GR96, 2013 XQ9, 2015 FH287 || 
|- id="2002 GM191" bgcolor=#E9E9E9
| 0 ||  || MBA-M || 16.81 || 2.8 km || multiple || 2002–2022 || 05 Jan 2022 || 162 || align=left | Disc.: NEATAlt.: 2006 HF55, 2010 LZ76 || 
|- id="2002 GN191" bgcolor=#fefefe
| 0 ||  || MBA-I || 17.51 || data-sort-value="0.94" | 940 m || multiple || 1995–2022 || 07 Jan 2022 || 216 || align=left | Disc.: NEATAlt.: 2015 AK53 || 
|- id="2002 GS191" bgcolor=#E9E9E9
| 0 ||  || MBA-M || 17.1 || 1.1 km || multiple || 2002–2020 || 23 Nov 2020 || 29 || align=left | Disc.: NEAT || 
|- id="2002 GU191" bgcolor=#d6d6d6
| 0 ||  || MBA-O || 15.1 || 5.3 km || multiple || 2002–2021 || 16 Jan 2021 || 195 || align=left | Disc.: NEATAlt.: 2005 VP12, 2008 CO93, 2010 JE129, 2015 FE344 || 
|- id="2002 GV191" bgcolor=#E9E9E9
| 0 ||  || MBA-M || 16.7 || 2.8 km || multiple || 2002–2020 || 10 Nov 2020 || 168 || align=left | Disc.: AMOSAlt.: 2010 JD98, 2012 US54 || 
|- id="2002 GY191" bgcolor=#d6d6d6
| 0 ||  || MBA-O || 16.25 || 3.1 km || multiple || 1999–2021 || 30 Nov 2021 || 203 || align=left | Disc.: NEAT || 
|- id="2002 GZ191" bgcolor=#FA8072
| 1 ||  || MCA || 19.2 || data-sort-value="0.43" | 430 m || multiple || 2002–2018 || 18 Mar 2018 || 48 || align=left | Disc.: NEATAlt.: 2005 EN262 || 
|- id="2002 GH192" bgcolor=#d6d6d6
| 0 ||  || MBA-O || 16.04 || 3.4 km || multiple || 2002–2021 || 25 Nov 2021 || 190 || align=left | Disc.: NEAT || 
|- id="2002 GM192" bgcolor=#d6d6d6
| 0 ||  || MBA-O || 16.4 || 2.9 km || multiple || 2002–2019 || 10 May 2019 || 88 || align=left | Disc.: LONEOS || 
|- id="2002 GN192" bgcolor=#d6d6d6
| 0 ||  || MBA-O || 16.68 || 2.6 km || multiple || 2002–2021 || 29 Sep 2021 || 115 || align=left | Disc.: Cerro Tololo || 
|- id="2002 GO192" bgcolor=#d6d6d6
| 0 ||  || MBA-O || 16.7 || 2.5 km || multiple || 2002–2019 || 07 May 2019 || 91 || align=left | Disc.: LPL/Spacewatch II || 
|- id="2002 GQ192" bgcolor=#d6d6d6
| 0 ||  || MBA-O || 15.92 || 3.6 km || multiple || 2002–2021 || 03 Apr 2021 || 151 || align=left | Disc.: LPL/Spacewatch IIAlt.: 2010 FQ102 || 
|- id="2002 GZ192" bgcolor=#d6d6d6
| 0 ||  || MBA-O || 16.2 || 3.2 km || multiple || 2002–2020 || 22 May 2020 || 97 || align=left | Disc.: Kitt Peak Obs. || 
|- id="2002 GA193" bgcolor=#fefefe
| 0 ||  || MBA-I || 18.0 || data-sort-value="0.75" | 750 m || multiple || 2002–2021 || 16 Jan 2021 || 158 || align=left | Disc.: Cerro Tololo || 
|- id="2002 GB193" bgcolor=#fefefe
| 0 ||  || MBA-I || 18.36 || data-sort-value="0.63" | 630 m || multiple || 2002–2022 || 25 Jan 2022 || 85 || align=left | Disc.: Cerro Tololo || 
|- id="2002 GK193" bgcolor=#fefefe
| 0 ||  || MBA-I || 18.3 || data-sort-value="0.65" | 650 m || multiple || 1996–2019 || 22 Aug 2019 || 80 || align=left | Disc.: Cerro Tololo || 
|- id="2002 GM193" bgcolor=#E9E9E9
| 0 ||  || MBA-M || 17.27 || 1.5 km || multiple || 2002–2021 || 31 Oct 2021 || 98 || align=left | Disc.: Cerro Tololo || 
|- id="2002 GN193" bgcolor=#E9E9E9
| 0 ||  || MBA-M || 18.18 || data-sort-value="0.97" | 970 m || multiple || 2002–2021 || 01 Dec 2021 || 63 || align=left | Disc.: Cerro Tololo || 
|- id="2002 GO193" bgcolor=#fefefe
| 0 ||  || MBA-I || 18.5 || data-sort-value="0.59" | 590 m || multiple || 2002–2019 || 28 Sep 2019 || 78 || align=left | Disc.: Cerro Tololo || 
|- id="2002 GP193" bgcolor=#fefefe
| 0 ||  || MBA-I || 18.3 || data-sort-value="0.65" | 650 m || multiple || 2002–2020 || 10 Dec 2020 || 67 || align=left | Disc.: Kitt Peak Obs. || 
|- id="2002 GQ193" bgcolor=#d6d6d6
| 0 ||  || MBA-O || 16.82 || 2.4 km || multiple || 2002–2021 || 30 Oct 2021 || 101 || align=left | Disc.: Spacewatch || 
|- id="2002 GR193" bgcolor=#d6d6d6
| 0 ||  || MBA-O || 16.7 || 2.5 km || multiple || 1994–2021 || 17 Jan 2021 || 150 || align=left | Disc.: SpacewatchAlt.: 1994 SO11 || 
|- id="2002 GU193" bgcolor=#fefefe
| 0 ||  || MBA-I || 17.9 || data-sort-value="0.78" | 780 m || multiple || 2002–2020 || 15 Feb 2020 || 79 || align=left | Disc.: Spacewatch || 
|- id="2002 GV193" bgcolor=#FA8072
| 0 ||  || MCA || 18.2 || data-sort-value="0.68" | 680 m || multiple || 1996–2019 || 05 Nov 2019 || 85 || align=left | Disc.: NEAT || 
|- id="2002 GW193" bgcolor=#fefefe
| 0 ||  || MBA-I || 18.5 || data-sort-value="0.59" | 590 m || multiple || 2002–2020 || 23 Sep 2020 || 78 || align=left | Disc.: LPL/Spacewatch II || 
|- id="2002 GX193" bgcolor=#E9E9E9
| 0 ||  || MBA-M || 17.12 || 2.1 km || multiple || 2002–2021 || 02 May 2021 || 79 || align=left | Disc.: LPL/Spacewatch II || 
|- id="2002 GY193" bgcolor=#fefefe
| 0 ||  || MBA-I || 18.4 || data-sort-value="0.62" | 620 m || multiple || 2002–2020 || 23 Aug 2020 || 62 || align=left | Disc.: Cerro Tololo || 
|- id="2002 GZ193" bgcolor=#fefefe
| 0 ||  || MBA-I || 18.13 || data-sort-value="0.70" | 700 m || multiple || 2002–2021 || 10 Aug 2021 || 85 || align=left | Disc.: NEAT || 
|- id="2002 GB194" bgcolor=#E9E9E9
| 0 ||  || MBA-M || 16.8 || 1.8 km || multiple || 2002–2020 || 13 Jun 2020 || 60 || align=left | Disc.: NEAT || 
|- id="2002 GC194" bgcolor=#fefefe
| 0 ||  || MBA-I || 18.35 || data-sort-value="0.64" | 640 m || multiple || 2002–2021 || 11 May 2021 || 86 || align=left | Disc.: NEAT || 
|- id="2002 GE194" bgcolor=#E9E9E9
| 0 ||  || MBA-M || 17.53 || 1.3 km || multiple || 2002–2021 || 05 Aug 2021 || 49 || align=left | Disc.: LPL/Spacewatch II || 
|- id="2002 GG194" bgcolor=#fefefe
| 0 ||  || MBA-I || 18.4 || data-sort-value="0.62" | 620 m || multiple || 2002–2020 || 12 Sep 2020 || 63 || align=left | Disc.: LPL/Spacewatch II || 
|- id="2002 GH194" bgcolor=#fefefe
| 0 ||  || MBA-I || 17.9 || data-sort-value="0.78" | 780 m || multiple || 2002–2021 || 10 Apr 2021 || 71 || align=left | Disc.: Spacewatch || 
|- id="2002 GJ194" bgcolor=#fefefe
| 1 ||  || MBA-I || 18.3 || data-sort-value="0.65" | 650 m || multiple || 2002–2017 || 10 Nov 2017 || 46 || align=left | Disc.: LPL/Spacewatch II || 
|- id="2002 GK194" bgcolor=#d6d6d6
| 0 ||  || MBA-O || 16.9 || 2.3 km || multiple || 2002–2018 || 10 Jan 2018 || 51 || align=left | Disc.: Cerro Tololo || 
|- id="2002 GN194" bgcolor=#fefefe
| 0 ||  || MBA-I || 18.2 || data-sort-value="0.68" | 680 m || multiple || 2002–2018 || 01 Nov 2018 || 39 || align=left | Disc.: Kitt Peak Obs. || 
|- id="2002 GO194" bgcolor=#fefefe
| 0 ||  || MBA-I || 18.1 || data-sort-value="0.71" | 710 m || multiple || 2002–2020 || 15 Feb 2020 || 58 || align=left | Disc.: Spacewatch || 
|- id="2002 GP194" bgcolor=#E9E9E9
| 0 ||  || MBA-M || 17.1 || 1.1 km || multiple || 2002–2020 || 20 Dec 2020 || 102 || align=left | Disc.: LPL/Spacewatch II || 
|- id="2002 GQ194" bgcolor=#fefefe
| 0 ||  || MBA-I || 18.2 || data-sort-value="0.68" | 680 m || multiple || 2002–2020 || 26 Jan 2020 || 47 || align=left | Disc.: Spacewatch || 
|- id="2002 GS194" bgcolor=#E9E9E9
| 0 ||  || MBA-M || 17.4 || 1.8 km || multiple || 2002–2020 || 22 Apr 2020 || 53 || align=left | Disc.: LPL/Spacewatch II || 
|- id="2002 GV194" bgcolor=#fefefe
| 0 ||  || MBA-I || 18.19 || data-sort-value="0.68" | 680 m || multiple || 2002–2021 || 01 Oct 2021 || 79 || align=left | Disc.: Cerro Tololo || 
|- id="2002 GW194" bgcolor=#fefefe
| 0 ||  || MBA-I || 18.2 || data-sort-value="0.68" | 680 m || multiple || 2002–2020 || 19 Sep 2020 || 56 || align=left | Disc.: NEAT || 
|- id="2002 GX194" bgcolor=#E9E9E9
| 0 ||  || MBA-M || 17.14 || 2.1 km || multiple || 2002–2021 || 05 Jul 2021 || 69 || align=left | Disc.: LPL/Spacewatch II || 
|- id="2002 GZ194" bgcolor=#fefefe
| 0 ||  || MBA-I || 18.7 || data-sort-value="0.54" | 540 m || multiple || 2002–2019 || 24 Oct 2019 || 73 || align=left | Disc.: Cerro Tololo || 
|- id="2002 GA195" bgcolor=#E9E9E9
| 0 ||  || MBA-M || 17.6 || 1.7 km || multiple || 2002–2020 || 25 May 2020 || 50 || align=left | Disc.: Cerro Tololo || 
|- id="2002 GB195" bgcolor=#fefefe
| 0 ||  || MBA-I || 17.9 || data-sort-value="0.78" | 780 m || multiple || 2002–2020 || 23 May 2020 || 92 || align=left | Disc.: NEAT || 
|- id="2002 GC195" bgcolor=#fefefe
| 0 ||  || MBA-I || 18.3 || data-sort-value="0.65" | 650 m || multiple || 2002–2020 || 25 Jan 2020 || 39 || align=left | Disc.: LPL/Spacewatch II || 
|- id="2002 GD195" bgcolor=#E9E9E9
| 1 ||  || MBA-M || 18.1 || data-sort-value="0.71" | 710 m || multiple || 2002–2020 || 18 Sep 2020 || 42 || align=left | Disc.: NEATAlt.: 2008 UO375 || 
|- id="2002 GE195" bgcolor=#C2FFFF
| 0 ||  || JT || 14.9 || 5.8 km || multiple || 2002–2017 || 08 Dec 2017 || 42 || align=left | Disc.: LPL/Spacewatch IIMBA at MPC || 
|- id="2002 GF195" bgcolor=#d6d6d6
| 3 ||  || MBA-O || 17.4 || 1.8 km || multiple || 2002–2017 || 27 Apr 2017 || 41 || align=left | Disc.: NEAT || 
|- id="2002 GJ195" bgcolor=#E9E9E9
| 0 ||  || MBA-M || 18.52 || data-sort-value="0.83" | 830 m || multiple || 2002–2022 || 06 Jan 2022 || 34 || align=left | Disc.: Cerro Tololo || 
|- id="2002 GK195" bgcolor=#E9E9E9
| 0 ||  || MBA-M || 17.8 || 1.5 km || multiple || 2002–2020 || 02 Feb 2020 || 87 || align=left | Disc.: Cerro Tololo || 
|- id="2002 GL195" bgcolor=#FA8072
| 0 ||  || MCA || 18.4 || data-sort-value="0.62" | 620 m || multiple || 2002–2019 || 02 Jun 2019 || 40 || align=left | Disc.: Cerro Tololo || 
|- id="2002 GM195" bgcolor=#E9E9E9
| 0 ||  || MBA-M || 17.7 || 1.6 km || multiple || 2002–2020 || 02 Feb 2020 || 78 || align=left | Disc.: Cerro Tololo || 
|- id="2002 GN195" bgcolor=#E9E9E9
| 0 ||  || MBA-M || 17.9 || data-sort-value="0.78" | 780 m || multiple || 2002–2020 || 11 Jul 2020 || 47 || align=left | Disc.: Cerro Tololo || 
|- id="2002 GO195" bgcolor=#fefefe
| 0 ||  || MBA-I || 18.0 || data-sort-value="0.75" | 750 m || multiple || 2002–2021 || 08 Jun 2021 || 52 || align=left | Disc.: LPL/Spacewatch II || 
|- id="2002 GP195" bgcolor=#fefefe
| 0 ||  || MBA-I || 18.2 || data-sort-value="0.68" | 680 m || multiple || 2002–2021 || 18 Jan 2021 || 47 || align=left | Disc.: LPL/Spacewatch II || 
|- id="2002 GQ195" bgcolor=#fefefe
| 0 ||  || MBA-I || 17.6 || data-sort-value="0.90" | 900 m || multiple || 2002–2021 || 16 Jan 2021 || 39 || align=left | Disc.: NEAT || 
|- id="2002 GR195" bgcolor=#E9E9E9
| 0 ||  || MBA-M || 17.59 || 1.7 km || multiple || 2002–2021 || 09 Aug 2021 || 57 || align=left | Disc.: NEAT || 
|- id="2002 GT195" bgcolor=#fefefe
| 0 ||  || HUN || 18.56 || data-sort-value="0.58" | 580 m || multiple || 2002–2021 || 30 Aug 2021 || 30 || align=left | Disc.: NEAT || 
|- id="2002 GV195" bgcolor=#E9E9E9
| 0 ||  || MBA-M || 17.57 || data-sort-value="0.91" | 910 m || multiple || 1995–2022 || 27 Jan 2022 || 145 || align=left | Disc.: SpacewatchAlt.: 1995 UL12 || 
|- id="2002 GW195" bgcolor=#d6d6d6
| 0 ||  || MBA-O || 16.7 || 2.5 km || multiple || 2002–2019 || 28 Nov 2019 || 76 || align=left | Disc.: LPL/Spacewatch II || 
|- id="2002 GY195" bgcolor=#E9E9E9
| 0 ||  || MBA-M || 17.64 || data-sort-value="0.88" | 880 m || multiple || 2002–2022 || 06 Jan 2022 || 79 || align=left | Disc.: NEATAlt.: 2010 LT7 || 
|- id="2002 GZ195" bgcolor=#E9E9E9
| 0 ||  || MBA-M || 18.3 || data-sort-value="0.92" | 920 m || multiple || 2002–2020 || 14 Sep 2020 || 69 || align=left | Disc.: Spacewatch || 
|- id="2002 GB196" bgcolor=#E9E9E9
| 0 ||  || MBA-M || 17.81 || 1.2 km || multiple || 2002–2021 || 31 Oct 2021 || 87 || align=left | Disc.: NEAT || 
|- id="2002 GD196" bgcolor=#E9E9E9
| 0 ||  || MBA-M || 18.21 || data-sort-value="0.68" | 680 m || multiple || 2002–2021 || 11 Nov 2021 || 56 || align=left | Disc.: NEAT || 
|- id="2002 GE196" bgcolor=#d6d6d6
| 0 ||  || MBA-O || 17.0 || 2.2 km || multiple || 2002–2021 || 17 Jan 2021 || 64 || align=left | Disc.: Spacewatch || 
|- id="2002 GF196" bgcolor=#E9E9E9
| 0 ||  || MBA-M || 17.4 || 1.4 km || multiple || 2002–2020 || 23 Sep 2020 || 70 || align=left | Disc.: NEAT || 
|- id="2002 GG196" bgcolor=#fefefe
| 0 ||  || MBA-I || 18.6 || data-sort-value="0.57" | 570 m || multiple || 2002–2020 || 20 Apr 2020 || 58 || align=left | Disc.: Spacewatch || 
|- id="2002 GJ196" bgcolor=#E9E9E9
| 3 ||  || MBA-M || 18.2 || data-sort-value="0.96" | 960 m || multiple || 2002–2019 || 03 Jun 2019 || 52 || align=left | Disc.: NEAT || 
|- id="2002 GK196" bgcolor=#fefefe
| 0 ||  || MBA-I || 18.3 || data-sort-value="0.65" | 650 m || multiple || 2002–2020 || 17 Dec 2020 || 152 || align=left | Disc.: Cerro Tololo || 
|- id="2002 GL196" bgcolor=#d6d6d6
| 0 ||  || MBA-O || 17.2 || 2.0 km || multiple || 2002–2019 || 05 Oct 2019 || 52 || align=left | Disc.: LPL/Spacewatch II || 
|- id="2002 GN196" bgcolor=#fefefe
| 1 ||  || MBA-I || 18.6 || data-sort-value="0.57" | 570 m || multiple || 2002–2019 || 30 Nov 2019 || 62 || align=left | Disc.: Cerro Tololo || 
|- id="2002 GO196" bgcolor=#E9E9E9
| 0 ||  || MBA-M || 17.95 || 1.1 km || multiple || 2002–2021 || 11 Nov 2021 || 65 || align=left | Disc.: NEAT || 
|- id="2002 GP196" bgcolor=#d6d6d6
| 1 ||  || MBA-O || 17.4 || 1.8 km || multiple || 2002–2021 || 18 Jan 2021 || 52 || align=left | Disc.: Cerro Tololo || 
|- id="2002 GR196" bgcolor=#d6d6d6
| 0 ||  || MBA-O || 16.70 || 2.5 km || multiple || 2002–2021 || 13 Sep 2021 || 46 || align=left | Disc.: LPL/Spacewatch II || 
|- id="2002 GT196" bgcolor=#fefefe
| 2 ||  || MBA-I || 18.5 || data-sort-value="0.59" | 590 m || multiple || 2002–2018 || 10 Jul 2018 || 36 || align=left | Disc.: Cerro Tololo || 
|- id="2002 GU196" bgcolor=#fefefe
| 1 ||  || MBA-I || 18.4 || data-sort-value="0.62" | 620 m || multiple || 2002–2019 || 27 Oct 2019 || 39 || align=left | Disc.: Spacewatch || 
|- id="2002 GV196" bgcolor=#fefefe
| 0 ||  || MBA-I || 18.0 || data-sort-value="0.75" | 750 m || multiple || 2002–2020 || 16 Mar 2020 || 53 || align=left | Disc.: Cerro Tololo || 
|- id="2002 GW196" bgcolor=#E9E9E9
| 0 ||  || MBA-M || 17.33 || 1.4 km || multiple || 2002–2021 || 29 Nov 2021 || 97 || align=left | Disc.: NEATAlt.: 2010 JN16 || 
|- id="2002 GX196" bgcolor=#fefefe
| 0 ||  || MBA-I || 18.5 || data-sort-value="0.59" | 590 m || multiple || 2002–2018 || 11 Nov 2018 || 43 || align=left | Disc.: Cerro Tololo || 
|- id="2002 GY196" bgcolor=#d6d6d6
| 0 ||  || MBA-O || 16.50 || 2.8 km || multiple || 2002–2021 || 04 Nov 2021 || 37 || align=left | Disc.: Cerro Tololo || 
|- id="2002 GZ196" bgcolor=#fefefe
| 0 ||  || MBA-I || 18.6 || data-sort-value="0.57" | 570 m || multiple || 2002–2020 || 10 Nov 2020 || 64 || align=left | Disc.: Spacewatch || 
|- id="2002 GA197" bgcolor=#E9E9E9
| 0 ||  || MBA-M || 17.78 || 1.2 km || multiple || 2002–2021 || 26 Oct 2021 || 45 || align=left | Disc.: NEAT || 
|- id="2002 GB197" bgcolor=#fefefe
| 0 ||  || MBA-I || 17.7 || data-sort-value="0.86" | 860 m || multiple || 2002–2021 || 11 Jun 2021 || 157 || align=left | Disc.: NEAT || 
|- id="2002 GC197" bgcolor=#d6d6d6
| 0 ||  || MBA-O || 16.52 || 2.8 km || multiple || 2002–2021 || 04 Oct 2021 || 102 || align=left | Disc.: Cerro Tololo || 
|- id="2002 GD197" bgcolor=#E9E9E9
| 0 ||  || MBA-M || 17.4 || data-sort-value="0.98" | 980 m || multiple || 2002–2019 || 21 Sep 2019 || 63 || align=left | Disc.: Cerro Tololo || 
|- id="2002 GG197" bgcolor=#d6d6d6
| 0 ||  || MBA-O || 17.1 || 2.1 km || multiple || 2002–2018 || 15 Sep 2018 || 49 || align=left | Disc.: Cerro Tololo || 
|- id="2002 GH197" bgcolor=#C2FFFF
| 0 ||  || JT || 14.39 || 7.4 km || multiple || 2002–2021 || 29 Nov 2021 || 90 || align=left | Disc.: LPL/Spacewatch IIGreek camp (L4) || 
|- id="2002 GJ197" bgcolor=#d6d6d6
| 0 ||  || MBA-O || 16.83 || 2.4 km || multiple || 2002–2021 || 26 Nov 2021 || 82 || align=left | Disc.: Cerro Tololo || 
|- id="2002 GK197" bgcolor=#fefefe
| 2 ||  || MBA-I || 18.6 || data-sort-value="0.57" | 570 m || multiple || 2002–2019 || 03 Oct 2019 || 36 || align=left | Disc.: Cerro Tololo || 
|- id="2002 GM197" bgcolor=#d6d6d6
| 0 ||  || MBA-O || 17.3 || 1.9 km || multiple || 2002–2019 || 27 Oct 2019 || 53 || align=left | Disc.: Cerro Tololo || 
|- id="2002 GN197" bgcolor=#C2FFFF
| 0 ||  || JT || 14.44 || 7.2 km || multiple || 2002–2021 || 28 Nov 2021 || 104 || align=left | Disc.: LPL/Spacewatch IIGreek camp (L4) || 
|- id="2002 GO197" bgcolor=#fefefe
| 1 ||  || MBA-I || 19.0 || data-sort-value="0.47" | 470 m || multiple || 2002–2020 || 14 Feb 2020 || 50 || align=left | Disc.: Cerro Tololo || 
|- id="2002 GP197" bgcolor=#E9E9E9
| 0 ||  || MBA-M || 17.6 || data-sort-value="0.90" | 900 m || multiple || 2002–2020 || 13 Sep 2020 || 67 || align=left | Disc.: Cerro Tololo || 
|- id="2002 GQ197" bgcolor=#d6d6d6
| 0 ||  || MBA-O || 17.45 || 1.8 km || multiple || 2002–2021 || 13 Sep 2021 || 106 || align=left | Disc.: Cerro Tololo || 
|- id="2002 GR197" bgcolor=#d6d6d6
| 0 ||  || MBA-O || 16.93 || 2.3 km || multiple || 2002–2021 || 18 May 2021 || 66 || align=left | Disc.: Cerro Tololo || 
|- id="2002 GS197" bgcolor=#E9E9E9
| 0 ||  || MBA-M || 18.13 || data-sort-value="0.99" | 990 m || multiple || 1995–2021 || 31 Aug 2021 || 50 || align=left | Disc.: Cerro Tololo || 
|- id="2002 GT197" bgcolor=#d6d6d6
| 0 ||  || MBA-O || 17.34 || 1.9 km || multiple || 2002–2021 || 13 Nov 2021 || 37 || align=left | Disc.: Cerro Tololo || 
|- id="2002 GU197" bgcolor=#E9E9E9
| 0 ||  || MBA-M || 17.84 || data-sort-value="0.80" | 800 m || multiple || 2002–2022 || 25 Jan 2022 || 60 || align=left | Disc.: Spacewatch || 
|- id="2002 GV197" bgcolor=#d6d6d6
| 0 ||  || MBA-O || 17.19 || 2.0 km || multiple || 2002–2022 || 25 Jan 2022 || 74 || align=left | Disc.: Astrovirtel || 
|- id="2002 GW197" bgcolor=#d6d6d6
| 0 ||  || MBA-O || 17.14 || 2.1 km || multiple || 2002–2022 || 27 Jan 2022 || 65 || align=left | Disc.: NEATAdded on 22 July 2020 || 
|- id="2002 GX197" bgcolor=#fefefe
| 0 ||  || MBA-I || 18.2 || data-sort-value="0.68" | 680 m || multiple || 2002–2020 || 23 Oct 2020 || 44 || align=left | Disc.: LPL/Spacewatch IIAdded on 22 July 2020 || 
|- id="2002 GY197" bgcolor=#E9E9E9
| 0 ||  || MBA-M || 17.72 || data-sort-value="0.85" | 850 m || multiple || 2002–2022 || 21 Jan 2022 || 55 || align=left | Disc.: NEATAdded on 19 October 2020 || 
|- id="2002 GA198" bgcolor=#E9E9E9
| 0 ||  || MBA-M || 17.7 || 1.2 km || multiple || 2002–2020 || 17 Sep 2020 || 28 || align=left | Disc.: Cerro TololoAdded on 17 January 2021 || 
|- id="2002 GD198" bgcolor=#C2FFFF
| 0 ||  || JT || 14.77 || 6.2 km || multiple || 2001–2021 || 11 Nov 2021 || 45 || align=left | Disc.: Cerro TololoAdded on 9 March 2021Greek camp (L4) || 
|- id="2002 GE198" bgcolor=#d6d6d6
| 0 ||  || MBA-O || 17.55 || 1.7 km || multiple || 2002–2021 || 20 Mar 2021 || 86 || align=left | Disc.: LPL/Spacewatch IIAdded on 11 May 2021 || 
|- id="2002 GG198" bgcolor=#E9E9E9
| 0 ||  || MBA-M || 17.76 || 1.6 km || multiple || 1998–2021 || 06 Nov 2021 || 81 || align=left | Disc.: NEATAdded on 30 September 2021Alt.: 2011 GQ9 || 
|- id="2002 GH198" bgcolor=#fefefe
| 0 ||  || MBA-I || 18.48 || data-sort-value="0.60" | 600 m || multiple || 2002–2021 || 11 Nov 2021 || 107 || align=left | Disc.: LPL/Spacewatch IIAdded on 30 September 2021 || 
|}
back to top

H 

|- id="2002 HF" bgcolor=#FA8072
| 5 || 2002 HF || MCA || 19.3 || data-sort-value="0.77" | 770 m || single || 75 days || 30 Jun 2002 || 46 || align=left | Disc.: LINEAR || 
|- id="2002 HM5" bgcolor=#E9E9E9
| 1 ||  || MBA-M || 17.7 || 1.2 km || multiple || 2002–2020 || 11 Sep 2020 || 123 || align=left | Disc.: LINEARAlt.: 2015 CX46 || 
|- id="2002 HD8" bgcolor=#FA8072
| 1 ||  || MCA || 17.8 || data-sort-value="0.82" | 820 m || multiple || 2002–2020 || 10 Aug 2020 || 101 || align=left | Disc.: Spacewatch || 
|- id="2002 HE8" bgcolor=#FFC2E0
| 2 ||  || AMO || 20.5 || data-sort-value="0.28" | 280 m || multiple || 2002–2014 || 25 Nov 2014 || 79 || align=left | Disc.: LONEOS || 
|- id="2002 HY8" bgcolor=#FA8072
| 0 ||  || MCA || 17.3 || 1.5 km || multiple || 2002–2020 || 20 Oct 2020 || 184 || align=left | Disc.: LINEARAlt.: 2015 TP167, 2019 GD5 || 
|- id="2002 HP11" bgcolor=#FFC2E0
| 2 ||  || APO || 20.5 || data-sort-value="0.30" | 280 m || multiple || 2002-2022 || 24 Aug 2022 || 79 || align=left | Disc.: LINEARPotentially hazardous object || 
|- id="2002 HT11" bgcolor=#FA8072
| 1 ||  || MCA || 17.9 || 1.1 km || multiple || 2002–2019 || 01 Jul 2019 || 77 || align=left | Disc.: LINEAR || 
|- id="2002 HT14" bgcolor=#fefefe
| 0 ||  || MBA-I || 17.86 || 2.2 km || multiple || 2002–2021 || 22 May 2021 || 153 || align=left | Disc.: LINEARAlt.: 2010 FW74 || 
|- id="2002 HQ16" bgcolor=#E9E9E9
| 0 ||  || MBA-M || 16.80 || 1.8 km || multiple || 2002–2021 || 15 Sep 2021 || 155 || align=left | Disc.: NEATAlt.: 2015 FB27 || 
|- id="2002 HM18" bgcolor=#d6d6d6
| 0 ||  || MBA-O || 16.41 || 2.9 km || multiple || 2002–2021 || 09 Oct 2021 || 157 || align=left | Disc.: NEATAlt.: 2010 UH87 || 
|- id="2002 HO18" bgcolor=#fefefe
| 0 ||  || HUN || 18.1 || data-sort-value="0.71" | 710 m || multiple || 2002–2020 || 17 Aug 2020 || 98 || align=left | Disc.: NEAT || 
|- id="2002 HT18" bgcolor=#E9E9E9
| – ||  || MBA-M || 17.9 || data-sort-value="0.78" | 780 m || single || 22 days || 13 May 2002 || 11 || align=left | Disc.: NEAT || 
|- id="2002 HU18" bgcolor=#E9E9E9
| 0 ||  || MBA-M || 16.77 || 1.9 km || multiple || 2002–2021 || 30 Nov 2021 || 183 || align=left | Disc.: NEATAlt.: 2015 MM17 || 
|- id="2002 HY18" bgcolor=#d6d6d6
| 0 ||  || MBA-O || 17.0 || 2.2 km || multiple || 2002–2020 || 26 Jun 2020 || 65 || align=left | Disc.: LPL/Spacewatch II || 
|- id="2002 HA19" bgcolor=#d6d6d6
| 0 ||  || MBA-O || 17.25 || 2.0 km || multiple || 2002–2022 || 26 Jan 2022 || 37 || align=left | Disc.: LPL/Spacewatch II || 
|- id="2002 HB19" bgcolor=#fefefe
| 0 ||  || MBA-I || 18.6 || data-sort-value="0.57" | 570 m || multiple || 2002–2020 || 18 Apr 2020 || 60 || align=left | Disc.: Spacewatch || 
|- id="2002 HD19" bgcolor=#E9E9E9
| 0 ||  || MBA-M || 17.8 || data-sort-value="0.82" | 820 m || multiple || 2002–2019 || 02 Oct 2019 || 62 || align=left | Disc.: Spacewatch || 
|- id="2002 HE19" bgcolor=#E9E9E9
| 0 ||  || MBA-M || 18.52 || data-sort-value="0.83" | 830 m || multiple || 2002–2021 || 28 Oct 2021 || 54 || align=left | Disc.: LPL/Spacewatch II || 
|- id="2002 HG19" bgcolor=#E9E9E9
| 1 ||  || MBA-M || 16.9 || 1.2 km || multiple || 2002–2020 || 17 Oct 2020 || 60 || align=left | Disc.: NEATAlt.: 2010 LC18 || 
|- id="2002 HH19" bgcolor=#E9E9E9
| 0 ||  || MBA-M || 18.0 || 1.1 km || multiple || 2002–2020 || 14 Sep 2020 || 38 || align=left | Disc.: LPL/Spacewatch II || 
|- id="2002 HJ19" bgcolor=#fefefe
| 0 ||  || MBA-I || 17.7 || data-sort-value="0.86" | 860 m || multiple || 2002–2020 || 31 Jan 2020 || 40 || align=left | Disc.: LPL/Spacewatch IIAdded on 9 March 2021 || 
|}
back to top

J 

|- id="2002 JS2" bgcolor=#FFC2E0
| 2 ||  || APO || 18.5 || data-sort-value="0.71" | 710 m || multiple || 2002–2020 || 23 Aug 2020 || 129 || align=left | Disc.: LINEAR || 
|- id="2002 JB3" bgcolor=#E9E9E9
| 2 ||  || MBA-M || 18.4 || data-sort-value="0.62" | 620 m || multiple || 2002–2019 || 02 Sep 2019 || 54 || align=left | Disc.: LPL/Spacewatch IIAdded on 22 July 2020 || 
|- id="2002 JL3" bgcolor=#E9E9E9
| 0 ||  || MBA-M || 17.97 || 1.4 km || multiple || 2002–2021 || 09 Sep 2021 || 83 || align=left | Disc.: LPL/Spacewatch II || 
|- id="2002 JN3" bgcolor=#E9E9E9
| 0 ||  || MBA-M || 17.7 || data-sort-value="0.86" | 860 m || multiple || 2002–2019 || 29 Sep 2019 || 66 || align=left | Disc.: LPL/Spacewatch IIAlt.: 2010 NU127 || 
|- id="2002 JX8" bgcolor=#FFC2E0
| 0 ||  || ATE || 20.43 || data-sort-value="0.29" | 290 m || multiple || 2002–2021 || 22 May 2021 || 85 || align=left | Disc.: LINEARPotentially hazardous object || 
|- id="2002 JZ8" bgcolor=#FFC2E0
| 1 ||  || APO || 21.0 || data-sort-value="0.22" | 220 m || multiple || 2002–2019 || 29 Nov 2019 || 163 || align=left | Disc.: LINEARPotentially hazardous object || 
|- id="2002 JC9" bgcolor=#FFC2E0
| 1 ||  || APO || 18.5 || data-sort-value="0.71" | 710 m || multiple || 2002–2019 || 27 May 2019 || 122 || align=left | Disc.: LPL/Spacewatch II || 
|- id="2002 JD9" bgcolor=#FFC2E0
| 2 ||  || APO || 23.2 || data-sort-value="0.081" | 81 m || multiple || 2002–2019 || 05 Feb 2019 || 80 || align=left | Disc.: LINEAR || 
|- id="2002 JE9" bgcolor=#FFC2E0
| 2 ||  || APO || 21.4 || data-sort-value="0.19" | 190 m || multiple || 2001–2020 || 10 Sep 2020 || 216 || align=left | Disc.: LINEARPotentially hazardous object || 
|- id="2002 JQ9" bgcolor=#FFC2E0
| 0 ||  || APO || 19.24 || data-sort-value="0.50" | 500 m || multiple || 2002–2021 || 09 Sep 2021 || 188 || align=left | Disc.: LINEARPotentially hazardous object || 
|- id="2002 JE14" bgcolor=#d6d6d6
| 0 ||  || MBA-O || 16.0 || 3.5 km || multiple || 2002–2020 || 08 Dec 2020 || 310 || align=left | Disc.: NEATAlt.: 2010 DO16 || 
|- id="2002 JG14" bgcolor=#d6d6d6
| 1 ||  || MBA-O || 17.2 || 2.3 km || multiple || 2002–2020 || 07 Jan 2020 || 115 || align=left | Disc.: AMOS || 
|- id="2002 JJ14" bgcolor=#fefefe
| 1 ||  || MBA-I || 17.3 || 1.0 km || multiple || 2002–2020 || 21 May 2020 || 190 || align=left | Disc.: LINEAR || 
|- id="2002 JU15" bgcolor=#FFC2E0
| 4 ||  || APO || 26.2 || data-sort-value="0.020" | 20 m || single || 12 days || 20 May 2002 || 25 || align=left | Disc.: LINEAR || 
|- id="2002 JO16" bgcolor=#FA8072
| 1 ||  || MCA || 18.1 || 1.0 km || multiple || 2002–2015 || 18 May 2015 || 61 || align=left | Disc.: LINEAR || 
|- id="2002 JH37" bgcolor=#FA8072
| 1 ||  || MCA || 18.6 || data-sort-value="0.57" | 570 m || multiple || 2002–2021 || 16 Jan 2021 || 132 || align=left | Disc.: LINEAR || 
|- id="2002 JH48" bgcolor=#fefefe
| 0 ||  || MBA-I || 17.65 || data-sort-value="0.88" | 880 m || multiple || 2002–2021 || 09 Oct 2021 || 232 || align=left | Disc.: LINEARAlt.: 2013 JV48 || 
|- id="2002 JS67" bgcolor=#fefefe
| 0 ||  || MBA-I || 18.09 || data-sort-value="0.72" | 720 m || multiple || 2002–2020 || 13 Oct 2020 || 94 || align=left | Disc.: LINEAR || 
|- id="2002 JB68" bgcolor=#E9E9E9
| 1 ||  || MBA-M || 17.0 || 1.7 km || multiple || 2002–2020 || 22 Nov 2020 || 62 || align=left | Disc.: NEAT || 
|- id="2002 JC68" bgcolor=#FA8072
| 1 ||  || MCA || 16.8 || 2.4 km || multiple || 2002–2018 || 12 Jun 2018 || 122 || align=left | Disc.: NEAT || 
|- id="2002 JL68" bgcolor=#fefefe
| 0 ||  || HUN || 17.6 || data-sort-value="0.90" | 900 m || multiple || 2002–2021 || 11 Jun 2021 || 254 || align=left | Disc.: LINEAR || 
|- id="2002 JB86" bgcolor=#E9E9E9
| 0 ||  || MBA-M || 16.9 || 1.2 km || multiple || 2002–2021 || 18 Jan 2021 || 140 || align=left | Disc.: LINEAR || 
|- id="2002 JG90" bgcolor=#E9E9E9
| 0 ||  || MBA-M || 17.27 || 1.5 km || multiple || 2002–2021 || 01 Nov 2021 || 124 || align=left | Disc.: LINEARAlt.: 2010 HC11, 2015 LJ36 || 
|- id="2002 JP97" bgcolor=#FA8072
| 1 ||  || MCA || 18.41 || data-sort-value="0.62" | 620 m || multiple || 2002–2021 || 02 Dec 2021 || 74 || align=left | Disc.: LINEARAlt.: 2018 VN8 || 
|- id="2002 JQ97" bgcolor=#FFC2E0
| 0 ||  || AMO || 22.9 || data-sort-value="0.093" | 93 m || multiple || 2002–2005 || 05 Jul 2005 || 110 || align=left | Disc.: NEAT || 
|- id="2002 JC100" bgcolor=#d6d6d6
| 0 ||  || MBA-O || 16.03 || 3.5 km || multiple || 2002–2021 || 06 Nov 2021 || 323 || align=left | Disc.: LINEARAlt.: 2008 GT111 || 
|- id="2002 JF100" bgcolor=#E9E9E9
| 1 ||  || MBA-M || 18.7 || data-sort-value="0.76" | 760 m || multiple || 2002–2020 || 13 Sep 2020 || 60 || align=left | Disc.: Tenagra II Obs. || 
|- id="2002 JQ100" bgcolor=#FFC2E0
| 3 ||  || APO || 19.8 || data-sort-value="0.39" | 390 m || multiple || 2002–2020 || 20 May 2020 || 80 || align=left | Disc.: LINEAR || 
|- id="2002 JR100" bgcolor=#FFC2E0
| 2 ||  || ATE || 24.3 || data-sort-value="0.028" | 28 m || multiple || 2002–2018 || 21 May 2018 || 125 || align=left | Disc.: NEAT || 
|- id="2002 JT107" bgcolor=#E9E9E9
| 0 ||  || MBA-M || 17.9 || 1.1 km || multiple || 2002–2019 || 26 Feb 2019 || 52 || align=left | Disc.: Tenagra II Obs. || 
|- id="2002 JC108" bgcolor=#FA8072
| 4 ||  || MCA || 17.0 || 2.2 km || single || 66 days || 14 Jun 2002 || 33 || align=left | Disc.: NEAT || 
|- id="2002 JC109" bgcolor=#FA8072
| 0 ||  || MCA || 18.77 || data-sort-value="0.74" | 740 m || multiple || 2002–2019 || 29 Jun 2019 || 59 || align=left | Disc.: LINEAR || 
|- id="2002 JD109" bgcolor=#FFC2E0
| 2 ||  || APO || 18.4 || data-sort-value="0.74" | 740 m || multiple || 2002–2020 || 26 Jan 2020 || 53 || align=left | Disc.: LONEOS || 
|- id="2002 JE109" bgcolor=#FFE699
| 2 ||  || Asteroid || 18.8 || data-sort-value="0.97" | 970 m || multiple || 2002–2020 || 25 May 2020 || 72 || align=left | Disc.: LINEARMCA at MPCAlt.: 2020 FU7 || 
|- id="2002 JL120" bgcolor=#E9E9E9
| 0 ||  || MBA-M || 16.71 || 1.9 km || multiple || 2002–2021 || 02 Dec 2021 || 136 || align=left | Disc.: NEAT || 
|- id="2002 JL128" bgcolor=#fefefe
| 0 ||  || MBA-I || 17.64 || data-sort-value="0.88" | 880 m || multiple || 2002–2022 || 06 Jan 2022 || 225 || align=left | Disc.: NEATAlt.: 2015 CJ12 || 
|- id="2002 JJ140" bgcolor=#E9E9E9
| 0 ||  || MBA-M || 18.0 || 1.1 km || multiple || 2002–2020 || 19 Oct 2020 || 146 || align=left | Disc.: LPL/Spacewatch II || 
|- id="2002 JO141" bgcolor=#E9E9E9
| 0 ||  || MBA-M || 18.0 || data-sort-value="0.75" | 750 m || multiple || 2002–2020 || 14 Dec 2020 || 68 || align=left | Disc.: LPL/Spacewatch II || 
|- id="2002 JF142" bgcolor=#E9E9E9
| 0 ||  || MBA-M || 17.4 || data-sort-value="0.98" | 980 m || multiple || 2002–2020 || 16 Sep 2020 || 52 || align=left | Disc.: LINEARAlt.: 2008 WD65 || 
|- id="2002 JB143" bgcolor=#d6d6d6
| 0 ||  || MBA-O || 16.8 || 2.4 km || multiple || 2002–2020 || 23 Oct 2020 || 47 || align=left | Disc.: NEATAdded on 21 August 2021 || 
|- id="2002 JG148" bgcolor=#fefefe
| – ||  || MBA-I || 17.1 || 1.1 km || single || 20 days || 02 May 2002 || 9 || align=left | Disc.: AMOS || 
|- id="2002 JL148" bgcolor=#d6d6d6
| 0 ||  || MBA-O || 15.8 || 3.9 km || multiple || 2002–2021 || 02 Oct 2021 || 160 || align=left | Disc.: NEATAlt.: 2010 ND55 || 
|- id="2002 JX149" bgcolor=#d6d6d6
| 0 ||  || MBA-O || 15.89 || 3.7 km || multiple || 2002–2021 || 10 Nov 2021 || 198 || align=left | Disc.: Kvistaberg Obs.Alt.: 2005 VT136 || 
|- id="2002 JZ149" bgcolor=#E9E9E9
| 3 ||  || MBA-M || 18.3 || data-sort-value="0.92" | 920 m || multiple || 2002–2015 || 26 Jan 2015 || 30 || align=left | Disc.: NEATAlt.: 2015 AQ262 || 
|- id="2002 JH150" bgcolor=#d6d6d6
| 0 ||  || MBA-O || 16.97 || 2.2 km || multiple || 2002–2021 || 15 May 2021 || 105 || align=left | Disc.: NEATAlt.: 2008 TE140 || 
|- id="2002 JN150" bgcolor=#E9E9E9
| 1 ||  || MBA-M || 17.84 || 1.5 km || multiple || 2002–2021 || 08 Sep 2021 || 30 || align=left | Disc.: NEAT || 
|- id="2002 JT150" bgcolor=#FA8072
| 0 ||  || HUN || 18.14 || data-sort-value="0.70" | 700 m || multiple || 2002–2021 || 04 May 2021 || 170 || align=left | Disc.: NEATAlt.: 2010 TX137 || 
|- id="2002 JW150" bgcolor=#E9E9E9
| 0 ||  || MBA-M || 17.05 || 1.6 km || multiple || 2002–2021 || 23 Nov 2021 || 105 || align=left | Disc.: NEATAlt.: 2015 FZ184 || 
|- id="2002 JX150" bgcolor=#E9E9E9
| 0 ||  || MBA-M || 17.3 || 1.5 km || multiple || 2002–2020 || 20 Oct 2020 || 79 || align=left | Disc.: NEAT || 
|- id="2002 JH151" bgcolor=#E9E9E9
| 1 ||  || MBA-M || 17.5 || 2.4 km || multiple || 2002–2017 || 27 Dec 2017 || 57 || align=left | Disc.: NEATAlt.: 2004 XE190, 2010 JX132 || 
|- id="2002 JL151" bgcolor=#d6d6d6
| 0 ||  || MBA-O || 16.02 || 3.5 km || multiple || 2002–2021 || 26 Nov 2021 || 175 || align=left | Disc.: NEATAlt.: 2005 VT93 || 
|- id="2002 JQ151" bgcolor=#E9E9E9
| 0 ||  || MBA-M || 16.85 || 2.4 km || multiple || 2002–2021 || 25 Nov 2021 || 235 || align=left | Disc.: NEATAlt.: 2007 PL38, 2010 HH94, 2010 HG96, 2015 HR2 || 
|- id="2002 JR151" bgcolor=#fefefe
| 0 ||  || MBA-I || 17.7 || data-sort-value="0.86" | 860 m || multiple || 2002–2021 || 18 Jan 2021 || 148 || align=left | Disc.: NEAT || 
|- id="2002 JT151" bgcolor=#d6d6d6
| 0 ||  || MBA-O || 16.77 || 2.5 km || multiple || 2002–2021 || 08 May 2021 || 116 || align=left | Disc.: NEATAlt.: 2016 ET71 || 
|- id="2002 JX151" bgcolor=#d6d6d6
| 0 ||  || MBA-O || 15.56 || 4.3 km || multiple || 2002–2022 || 12 Jan 2022 || 199 || align=left | Disc.: NEATAlt.: 2010 BN64 || 
|- id="2002 JY151" bgcolor=#fefefe
| 0 ||  || MBA-I || 17.75 || data-sort-value="0.84" | 840 m || multiple || 2002–2021 || 10 Oct 2021 || 173 || align=left | Disc.: NEAT || 
|- id="2002 JZ151" bgcolor=#fefefe
| 0 ||  || MBA-I || 18.2 || data-sort-value="0.68" | 680 m || multiple || 2002–2021 || 18 Jan 2021 || 118 || align=left | Disc.: NEAT || 
|- id="2002 JA152" bgcolor=#fefefe
| 0 ||  || MBA-I || 18.14 || data-sort-value="0.70" | 700 m || multiple || 2002–2021 || 12 Aug 2021 || 77 || align=left | Disc.: LPL/Spacewatch II || 
|- id="2002 JC152" bgcolor=#E9E9E9
| 0 ||  || MBA-M || 17.50 || 1.3 km || multiple || 2002–2021 || 31 Oct 2021 || 91 || align=left | Disc.: LPL/Spacewatch II || 
|- id="2002 JE152" bgcolor=#fefefe
| 0 ||  || MBA-I || 17.9 || data-sort-value="0.78" | 780 m || multiple || 1995–2020 || 16 Nov 2020 || 83 || align=left | Disc.: NEAT || 
|- id="2002 JG152" bgcolor=#d6d6d6
| 0 ||  || MBA-O || 16.21 || 3.2 km || multiple || 2002–2021 || 12 Nov 2021 || 170 || align=left | Disc.: LPL/Spacewatch II || 
|- id="2002 JK152" bgcolor=#fefefe
| 0 ||  || MBA-I || 18.32 || data-sort-value="0.64" | 640 m || multiple || 2002–2021 || 28 Jul 2021 || 68 || align=left | Disc.: LPL/Spacewatch II || 
|- id="2002 JL152" bgcolor=#fefefe
| 0 ||  || MBA-I || 18.31 || data-sort-value="0.65" | 650 m || multiple || 2002–2022 || 25 Jan 2022 || 110 || align=left | Disc.: LPL/Spacewatch II || 
|- id="2002 JM152" bgcolor=#fefefe
| 0 ||  || MBA-I || 18.32 || data-sort-value="0.64" | 640 m || multiple || 2002–2021 || 11 Oct 2021 || 94 || align=left | Disc.: LPL/Spacewatch II || 
|- id="2002 JP152" bgcolor=#E9E9E9
| 0 ||  || MBA-M || 17.7 || 1.2 km || multiple || 2002–2019 || 03 Mar 2019 || 35 || align=left | Disc.: SDSS || 
|- id="2002 JQ152" bgcolor=#d6d6d6
| 0 ||  || MBA-O || 16.4 || 2.9 km || multiple || 2002–2020 || 16 Nov 2020 || 73 || align=left | Disc.: NEAT || 
|- id="2002 JS152" bgcolor=#fefefe
| 0 ||  || MBA-I || 18.4 || data-sort-value="0.62" | 620 m || multiple || 1999–2020 || 16 Sep 2020 || 84 || align=left | Disc.: LPL/Spacewatch II || 
|- id="2002 JV152" bgcolor=#d6d6d6
| 0 ||  || MBA-O || 16.4 || 2.9 km || multiple || 2002–2020 || 15 Oct 2020 || 95 || align=left | Disc.: LPL/Spacewatch II || 
|- id="2002 JA153" bgcolor=#fefefe
| 0 ||  || MBA-I || 18.66 || data-sort-value="0.55" | 550 m || multiple || 2002–2021 || 08 May 2021 || 94 || align=left | Disc.: NEAT || 
|- id="2002 JG153" bgcolor=#fefefe
| 0 ||  || MBA-I || 18.7 || data-sort-value="0.54" | 540 m || multiple || 2002–2019 || 26 Jul 2019 || 47 || align=left | Disc.: LPL/Spacewatch II || 
|- id="2002 JJ153" bgcolor=#E9E9E9
| 0 ||  || MBA-M || 17.92 || 1.1 km || multiple || 2002–2021 || 09 Dec 2021 || 86 || align=left | Disc.: LPL/Spacewatch IIAlt.: 2010 KC125 || 
|- id="2002 JK153" bgcolor=#FA8072
| 1 ||  || MCA || 19.1 || data-sort-value="0.45" | 450 m || multiple || 2002–2019 || 02 Oct 2019 || 38 || align=left | Disc.: LPL/Spacewatch II || 
|- id="2002 JL153" bgcolor=#fefefe
| 0 ||  || MBA-I || 18.37 || data-sort-value="0.63" | 630 m || multiple || 2002–2021 || 08 Sep 2021 || 76 || align=left | Disc.: LPL/Spacewatch II || 
|- id="2002 JO153" bgcolor=#fefefe
| 0 ||  || HUN || 18.73 || data-sort-value="0.53" | 530 m || multiple || 2002–2021 || 01 Apr 2021 || 43 || align=left | Disc.: SDSS || 
|- id="2002 JP153" bgcolor=#d6d6d6
| 3 ||  || MBA-O || 17.6 || 1.7 km || multiple || 2002–2017 || 17 Mar 2017 || 29 || align=left | Disc.: LPL/Spacewatch II || 
|- id="2002 JQ153" bgcolor=#d6d6d6
| 0 ||  || MBA-O || 17.1 || 2.1 km || multiple || 1998–2020 || 23 Oct 2020 || 95 || align=left | Disc.: LPL/Spacewatch II || 
|- id="2002 JR153" bgcolor=#d6d6d6
| 0 ||  || MBA-O || 15.99 || 3.5 km || multiple || 2002–2022 || 21 Jan 2022 || 166 || align=left | Disc.: LPL/Spacewatch II || 
|- id="2002 JS153" bgcolor=#d6d6d6
| 0 ||  || HIL || 15.9 || 3.7 km || multiple || 2002–2019 || 24 Aug 2019 || 52 || align=left | Disc.: LPL/Spacewatch II || 
|- id="2002 JT153" bgcolor=#fefefe
| 0 ||  || MBA-I || 17.8 || data-sort-value="0.82" | 820 m || multiple || 2002–2021 || 16 Jan 2021 || 63 || align=left | Disc.: NEAT || 
|- id="2002 JU153" bgcolor=#fefefe
| 0 ||  || MBA-I || 18.6 || data-sort-value="0.57" | 570 m || multiple || 2002–2020 || 16 May 2020 || 51 || align=left | Disc.: LPL/Spacewatch II || 
|- id="2002 JV153" bgcolor=#E9E9E9
| 0 ||  || MBA-M || 17.5 || data-sort-value="0.94" | 940 m || multiple || 2002–2018 || 18 Feb 2018 || 30 || align=left | Disc.: SDSS || 
|- id="2002 JW153" bgcolor=#d6d6d6
| 0 ||  || MBA-O || 16.9 || 2.3 km || multiple || 2002–2019 || 28 Oct 2019 || 59 || align=left | Disc.: LPL/Spacewatch II || 
|- id="2002 JY153" bgcolor=#fefefe
| 0 ||  || MBA-I || 18.39 || data-sort-value="0.62" | 620 m || multiple || 2002–2021 || 11 May 2021 || 75 || align=left | Disc.: NEAT || 
|}
back to top

K 

|- id="2002 KK3" bgcolor=#FFC2E0
| 1 ||  || AMO || 17.7 || 1.0 km || multiple || 2002–2017 || 01 Apr 2017 || 73 || align=left | Disc.: LONEOSNEO larger than 1 kilometer || 
|- id="2002 KM3" bgcolor=#FFC2E0
| 1 ||  || APO || 22.3 || data-sort-value="0.12" | 120 m || multiple || 2002–2019 || 24 Dec 2019 || 104 || align=left | Disc.: LPL/Spacewatch II || 
|- id="2002 KN3" bgcolor=#FA8072
| 1 ||  || MCA || 19.17 || data-sort-value="0.28" | 400 m || multiple || 2002-2022 days || 01 Jun 2022 || 61 || align=left | Disc.: LINEARAlt.: 2012 JM11, 2022 KT2  || 
|- id="2002 KG4" bgcolor=#FFC2E0
| 5 ||  || APO || 20.9 || data-sort-value="0.23" | 230 m || single || 31 days || 22 Jun 2002 || 182 || align=left | Disc.: LINEARPotentially hazardous object || 
|- id="2002 KJ8" bgcolor=#FFE699
| 5 ||  || Asteroid || 20.2 || data-sort-value="0.51" | 510 m || single || 48 days || 05 Jul 2002 || 29 || align=left | Disc.: NEATMCA at MPC || 
|- id="2002 KK8" bgcolor=#FFC2E0
| 0 ||  || AMO || 21.0 || data-sort-value="0.22" | 220 m || multiple || 2002–2013 || 08 May 2013 || 108 || align=left | Disc.: LINEARPotentially hazardous object || 
|- id="2002 KT11" bgcolor=#E9E9E9
| 0 ||  || MBA-M || 17.8 || data-sort-value="0.82" | 820 m || multiple || 2002–2019 || 01 Nov 2019 || 95 || align=left | Disc.: NEATAlt.: 2010 NL81, 2015 TQ278 || 
|- id="2002 KW11" bgcolor=#fefefe
| 0 ||  || MBA-I || 17.4 || data-sort-value="0.98" | 980 m || multiple || 2002–2020 || 04 Jan 2020 || 83 || align=left | Disc.: NEATAlt.: 2015 XS132 || 
|- id="2002 KJ15" bgcolor=#d6d6d6
| 0 ||  || MBA-O || 16.7 || 2.5 km || multiple || 1998–2020 || 23 Dec 2020 || 81 || align=left | Disc.: NEAT || 
|- id="2002 KV15" bgcolor=#E9E9E9
| 1 ||  || MBA-M || 18.27 || 850 m || multiple || 2002-2023 || 16 Mar 2023 || 32 || align=left | Disc.: NEATAlt.: 2019 JU122 || 
|- id="2002 KW15" bgcolor=#fefefe
| 0 ||  || MBA-I || 18.77 || data-sort-value="0.52" | 520 m || multiple || 2002–2022 || 27 Jan 2022 || 59 || align=left | Disc.: NEATAlt.: 2016 NV6 || 
|- id="2002 KO16" bgcolor=#fefefe
| 0 ||  || MBA-I || 18.50 || data-sort-value="0.59" | 590 m || multiple || 2002–2021 || 30 Jul 2021 || 168 || align=left | Disc.: NEATAlt.: 2012 UJ6 || 
|- id="2002 KS16" bgcolor=#E9E9E9
| 0 ||  || MBA-M || 17.6 || 1.3 km || multiple || 2002–2020 || 16 Oct 2020 || 88 || align=left | Disc.: NEATAlt.: 2015 HT143 || 
|- id="2002 KT16" bgcolor=#fefefe
| 0 ||  || MBA-I || 17.48 || data-sort-value="0.95" | 950 m || multiple || 1995–2021 || 10 Apr 2021 || 76 || align=left | Disc.: NEAT || 
|- id="2002 KU16" bgcolor=#fefefe
| 0 ||  || MBA-I || 18.0 || data-sort-value="0.75" | 750 m || multiple || 2002–2019 || 19 Dec 2019 || 122 || align=left | Disc.: NEATAlt.: 2015 HH37 || 
|- id="2002 KC17" bgcolor=#fefefe
| 0 ||  || MBA-I || 16.95 || 1.2 km || multiple || 2002–2021 || 17 Jun 2021 || 74 || align=left | Disc.: NEAT || 
|- id="2002 KD17" bgcolor=#d6d6d6
| 1 ||  || MBA-O || 16.8 || 2.4 km || multiple || 2002–2014 || 31 May 2014 || 27 || align=left | Disc.: AMOSAlt.: 2014 KY84 || 
|- id="2002 KF17" bgcolor=#fefefe
| 0 ||  || MBA-I || 18.2 || data-sort-value="0.68" | 680 m || multiple || 2002–2021 || 24 Jan 2021 || 78 || align=left | Disc.: NEAT || 
|- id="2002 KH17" bgcolor=#E9E9E9
| 0 ||  || MBA-M || 17.0 || 2.2 km || multiple || 2002–2020 || 27 Apr 2020 || 55 || align=left | Disc.: NEAT || 
|- id="2002 KK17" bgcolor=#d6d6d6
| 0 ||  || MBA-O || 16.16 || 3.3 km || multiple || 2002–2022 || 27 Jan 2022 || 58 || align=left | Disc.: LPL/Spacewatch II || 
|- id="2002 KL17" bgcolor=#fefefe
| 0 ||  || MBA-I || 18.2 || data-sort-value="0.68" | 680 m || multiple || 2002–2017 || 27 May 2017 || 43 || align=left | Disc.: NEAT || 
|- id="2002 KM17" bgcolor=#fefefe
| 0 ||  || MBA-I || 18.7 || data-sort-value="0.54" | 540 m || multiple || 2002–2020 || 24 Dec 2020 || 48 || align=left | Disc.: NEAT || 
|- id="2002 KO17" bgcolor=#E9E9E9
| 0 ||  || MBA-M || 17.36 || 1.4 km || multiple || 2002–2022 || 24 Jan 2022 || 113 || align=left | Disc.: NEATAlt.: 2010 KU120 || 
|- id="2002 KP17" bgcolor=#E9E9E9
| 0 ||  || MBA-M || 17.44 || 1.4 km || multiple || 2002–2022 || 25 Jan 2022 || 109 || align=left | Disc.: NEAT || 
|- id="2002 KQ17" bgcolor=#fefefe
| 0 ||  || MBA-I || 18.22 || data-sort-value="0.67" | 670 m || multiple || 2002–2021 || 11 May 2021 || 73 || align=left | Disc.: NEAT || 
|- id="2002 KT17" bgcolor=#d6d6d6
| 0 ||  || MBA-O || 16.4 || 2.9 km || multiple || 2002–2020 || 16 Dec 2020 || 71 || align=left | Disc.: LPL/Spacewatch IIAlt.: 2010 BX129 || 
|- id="2002 KU17" bgcolor=#d6d6d6
| 0 ||  || MBA-O || 16.4 || 2.9 km || multiple || 2002–2020 || 06 Dec 2020 || 59 || align=left | Disc.: NEAT || 
|- id="2002 KW17" bgcolor=#E9E9E9
| 0 ||  || MBA-M || 17.0 || 1.7 km || multiple || 2002–2021 || 04 Jan 2021 || 63 || align=left | Disc.: NEATAdded on 22 July 2020 || 
|}
back to top

References 
 

Lists of unnumbered minor planets